

440001–440100 

|-bgcolor=#fefefe
| 440001 ||  || — || February 10, 2002 || Socorro || LINEAR || — || align=right data-sort-value="0.80" | 800 m || 
|-id=002 bgcolor=#fefefe
| 440002 ||  || — || February 10, 2002 || Socorro || LINEAR || — || align=right data-sort-value="0.82" | 820 m || 
|-id=003 bgcolor=#d6d6d6
| 440003 ||  || — || February 16, 2002 || Palomar || NEAT || EOS || align=right | 2.1 km || 
|-id=004 bgcolor=#d6d6d6
| 440004 ||  || — || March 13, 2002 || Socorro || LINEAR || — || align=right | 3.9 km || 
|-id=005 bgcolor=#d6d6d6
| 440005 ||  || — || February 20, 2002 || Kitt Peak || Spacewatch || — || align=right | 2.9 km || 
|-id=006 bgcolor=#fefefe
| 440006 ||  || — || March 10, 2002 || Kitt Peak || Spacewatch || — || align=right data-sort-value="0.83" | 830 m || 
|-id=007 bgcolor=#E9E9E9
| 440007 ||  || — || April 11, 2002 || Socorro || LINEAR || — || align=right data-sort-value="0.98" | 980 m || 
|-id=008 bgcolor=#E9E9E9
| 440008 ||  || — || April 22, 2002 || Palomar || NEAT || — || align=right | 1.4 km || 
|-id=009 bgcolor=#E9E9E9
| 440009 ||  || — || May 4, 2002 || Socorro || LINEAR || — || align=right | 1.6 km || 
|-id=010 bgcolor=#E9E9E9
| 440010 ||  || — || May 13, 2002 || Palomar || NEAT || — || align=right data-sort-value="0.97" | 970 m || 
|-id=011 bgcolor=#E9E9E9
| 440011 ||  || — || May 18, 2002 || Palomar || NEAT || — || align=right | 2.4 km || 
|-id=012 bgcolor=#FFC2E0
| 440012 ||  || — || June 8, 2002 || Socorro || LINEAR || AMO || align=right data-sort-value="0.49" | 490 m || 
|-id=013 bgcolor=#E9E9E9
| 440013 ||  || — || June 9, 2002 || Socorro || LINEAR || JUN || align=right | 1.2 km || 
|-id=014 bgcolor=#E9E9E9
| 440014 ||  || — || June 12, 2002 || Palomar || NEAT || — || align=right | 2.4 km || 
|-id=015 bgcolor=#E9E9E9
| 440015 ||  || — || June 22, 2002 || Palomar || NEAT || (1547) || align=right | 1.3 km || 
|-id=016 bgcolor=#E9E9E9
| 440016 ||  || — || July 5, 2002 || Kitt Peak || Spacewatch || — || align=right | 1.7 km || 
|-id=017 bgcolor=#FA8072
| 440017 ||  || — || July 9, 2002 || Socorro || LINEAR || — || align=right | 1.3 km || 
|-id=018 bgcolor=#E9E9E9
| 440018 ||  || — || July 3, 2002 || Palomar || NEAT || — || align=right | 1.2 km || 
|-id=019 bgcolor=#fefefe
| 440019 ||  || — || July 12, 2002 || Palomar || NEAT || — || align=right data-sort-value="0.71" | 710 m || 
|-id=020 bgcolor=#fefefe
| 440020 ||  || — || July 6, 2002 || Palomar || NEAT || critical || align=right data-sort-value="0.45" | 450 m || 
|-id=021 bgcolor=#E9E9E9
| 440021 ||  || — || July 25, 2002 || Palomar || NEAT || — || align=right | 2.7 km || 
|-id=022 bgcolor=#FA8072
| 440022 ||  || — || July 18, 2002 || Socorro || LINEAR || — || align=right | 1.5 km || 
|-id=023 bgcolor=#E9E9E9
| 440023 ||  || — || July 9, 2002 || Socorro || LINEAR || — || align=right | 1.4 km || 
|-id=024 bgcolor=#fefefe
| 440024 ||  || — || July 21, 2002 || Palomar || NEAT || — || align=right data-sort-value="0.75" | 750 m || 
|-id=025 bgcolor=#fefefe
| 440025 ||  || — || July 29, 2002 || Palomar || NEAT || — || align=right data-sort-value="0.54" | 540 m || 
|-id=026 bgcolor=#E9E9E9
| 440026 ||  || — || August 4, 2002 || Palomar || NEAT || — || align=right | 1.7 km || 
|-id=027 bgcolor=#E9E9E9
| 440027 ||  || — || August 6, 2002 || Palomar || NEAT || — || align=right | 1.5 km || 
|-id=028 bgcolor=#E9E9E9
| 440028 ||  || — || August 6, 2002 || Palomar || NEAT || — || align=right data-sort-value="0.92" | 920 m || 
|-id=029 bgcolor=#E9E9E9
| 440029 ||  || — || August 6, 2002 || Palomar || NEAT || — || align=right | 1.6 km || 
|-id=030 bgcolor=#E9E9E9
| 440030 ||  || — || August 11, 2002 || Needville || Needville Obs. || — || align=right | 1.6 km || 
|-id=031 bgcolor=#E9E9E9
| 440031 ||  || — || August 14, 2002 || Palomar || NEAT || — || align=right | 3.8 km || 
|-id=032 bgcolor=#fefefe
| 440032 ||  || — || August 13, 2002 || Socorro || LINEAR || — || align=right data-sort-value="0.77" | 770 m || 
|-id=033 bgcolor=#E9E9E9
| 440033 ||  || — || August 13, 2002 || Anderson Mesa || LONEOS || (1547) || align=right | 1.9 km || 
|-id=034 bgcolor=#E9E9E9
| 440034 ||  || — || August 15, 2002 || Palomar || NEAT || — || align=right | 1.4 km || 
|-id=035 bgcolor=#E9E9E9
| 440035 ||  || — || August 13, 2002 || Socorro || LINEAR || — || align=right | 1.8 km || 
|-id=036 bgcolor=#E9E9E9
| 440036 ||  || — || August 12, 2002 || Socorro || LINEAR || — || align=right | 2.7 km || 
|-id=037 bgcolor=#E9E9E9
| 440037 ||  || — || August 11, 2002 || Socorro || LINEAR || — || align=right | 1.8 km || 
|-id=038 bgcolor=#E9E9E9
| 440038 ||  || — || August 10, 2002 || Cerro Tololo || M. W. Buie || — || align=right | 1.5 km || 
|-id=039 bgcolor=#E9E9E9
| 440039 ||  || — || August 8, 2002 || Palomar || S. F. Hönig || — || align=right | 1.7 km || 
|-id=040 bgcolor=#E9E9E9
| 440040 ||  || — || August 7, 2002 || Palomar || NEAT || — || align=right | 1.4 km || 
|-id=041 bgcolor=#E9E9E9
| 440041 ||  || — || August 17, 2002 || Palomar || NEAT || — || align=right | 2.0 km || 
|-id=042 bgcolor=#E9E9E9
| 440042 ||  || — || August 26, 2002 || Palomar || NEAT || — || align=right | 1.7 km || 
|-id=043 bgcolor=#FA8072
| 440043 ||  || — || August 29, 2002 || Palomar || NEAT || — || align=right | 1.0 km || 
|-id=044 bgcolor=#E9E9E9
| 440044 ||  || — || August 29, 2002 || Palomar || S. F. Hönig || — || align=right | 1.2 km || 
|-id=045 bgcolor=#fefefe
| 440045 ||  || — || August 31, 2002 || Palomar || NEAT || H || align=right data-sort-value="0.60" | 600 m || 
|-id=046 bgcolor=#fefefe
| 440046 ||  || — || August 29, 2002 || Palomar || NEAT || — || align=right data-sort-value="0.65" | 650 m || 
|-id=047 bgcolor=#E9E9E9
| 440047 ||  || — || August 19, 2002 || Palomar || NEAT || — || align=right | 1.4 km || 
|-id=048 bgcolor=#E9E9E9
| 440048 ||  || — || August 27, 2002 || Palomar || NEAT || — || align=right | 2.5 km || 
|-id=049 bgcolor=#E9E9E9
| 440049 ||  || — || August 17, 2002 || Palomar || NEAT || (1547) || align=right | 1.4 km || 
|-id=050 bgcolor=#E9E9E9
| 440050 ||  || — || August 27, 2002 || Palomar || NEAT || ADE || align=right | 1.9 km || 
|-id=051 bgcolor=#fefefe
| 440051 ||  || — || August 30, 2002 || Palomar || NEAT || — || align=right data-sort-value="0.57" | 570 m || 
|-id=052 bgcolor=#E9E9E9
| 440052 ||  || — || August 29, 2002 || Palomar || NEAT || — || align=right | 1.5 km || 
|-id=053 bgcolor=#E9E9E9
| 440053 ||  || — || August 19, 2002 || Palomar || NEAT || — || align=right | 1.6 km || 
|-id=054 bgcolor=#E9E9E9
| 440054 ||  || — || September 4, 2002 || Anderson Mesa || LONEOS || — || align=right | 1.5 km || 
|-id=055 bgcolor=#E9E9E9
| 440055 ||  || — || September 4, 2002 || Anderson Mesa || LONEOS || — || align=right | 2.1 km || 
|-id=056 bgcolor=#E9E9E9
| 440056 ||  || — || September 5, 2002 || Anderson Mesa || LONEOS || — || align=right | 1.8 km || 
|-id=057 bgcolor=#E9E9E9
| 440057 ||  || — || September 4, 2002 || Palomar || NEAT || — || align=right | 1.9 km || 
|-id=058 bgcolor=#E9E9E9
| 440058 ||  || — || August 11, 2002 || Socorro || LINEAR || — || align=right | 1.8 km || 
|-id=059 bgcolor=#E9E9E9
| 440059 ||  || — || September 5, 2002 || Socorro || LINEAR || — || align=right | 1.7 km || 
|-id=060 bgcolor=#fefefe
| 440060 ||  || — || September 5, 2002 || Socorro || LINEAR || — || align=right data-sort-value="0.79" | 790 m || 
|-id=061 bgcolor=#E9E9E9
| 440061 ||  || — || September 6, 2002 || Socorro || LINEAR || — || align=right | 2.2 km || 
|-id=062 bgcolor=#fefefe
| 440062 ||  || — || September 6, 2002 || Socorro || LINEAR || H || align=right data-sort-value="0.64" | 640 m || 
|-id=063 bgcolor=#E9E9E9
| 440063 ||  || — || September 7, 2002 || Socorro || LINEAR || — || align=right | 2.3 km || 
|-id=064 bgcolor=#fefefe
| 440064 ||  || — || September 12, 2002 || Palomar || NEAT || — || align=right data-sort-value="0.78" | 780 m || 
|-id=065 bgcolor=#E9E9E9
| 440065 ||  || — || September 14, 2002 || Haleakala || NEAT || — || align=right | 2.2 km || 
|-id=066 bgcolor=#fefefe
| 440066 ||  || — || September 14, 2002 || Palomar || R. Matson || H || align=right data-sort-value="0.64" | 640 m || 
|-id=067 bgcolor=#E9E9E9
| 440067 ||  || — || September 8, 2002 || Haleakala || R. Matson || EUN || align=right | 1.9 km || 
|-id=068 bgcolor=#E9E9E9
| 440068 ||  || — || September 3, 2002 || Haleakala || NEAT || — || align=right | 1.4 km || 
|-id=069 bgcolor=#E9E9E9
| 440069 ||  || — || September 10, 2002 || Palomar || NEAT || — || align=right | 1.8 km || 
|-id=070 bgcolor=#fefefe
| 440070 ||  || — || September 4, 2002 || Palomar || NEAT || — || align=right data-sort-value="0.71" | 710 m || 
|-id=071 bgcolor=#fefefe
| 440071 ||  || — || September 5, 2002 || Socorro || LINEAR || — || align=right data-sort-value="0.68" | 680 m || 
|-id=072 bgcolor=#E9E9E9
| 440072 ||  || — || September 27, 2002 || Palomar || NEAT || — || align=right | 1.5 km || 
|-id=073 bgcolor=#E9E9E9
| 440073 ||  || — || September 26, 2002 || Palomar || NEAT || (1547) || align=right | 1.7 km || 
|-id=074 bgcolor=#FA8072
| 440074 ||  || — || September 6, 2002 || Socorro || LINEAR || critical || align=right data-sort-value="0.52" | 520 m || 
|-id=075 bgcolor=#E9E9E9
| 440075 ||  || — || September 28, 2002 || Palomar || NEAT || — || align=right | 2.2 km || 
|-id=076 bgcolor=#fefefe
| 440076 ||  || — || September 26, 2002 || Palomar || NEAT || — || align=right data-sort-value="0.58" | 580 m || 
|-id=077 bgcolor=#E9E9E9
| 440077 ||  || — || September 17, 2002 || Palomar || NEAT || — || align=right | 1.3 km || 
|-id=078 bgcolor=#E9E9E9
| 440078 ||  || — || October 2, 2002 || Socorro || LINEAR || — || align=right | 1.8 km || 
|-id=079 bgcolor=#E9E9E9
| 440079 ||  || — || October 2, 2002 || Socorro || LINEAR || — || align=right | 1.8 km || 
|-id=080 bgcolor=#E9E9E9
| 440080 ||  || — || October 3, 2002 || Campo Imperatore || CINEOS || — || align=right | 1.6 km || 
|-id=081 bgcolor=#fefefe
| 440081 ||  || — || October 6, 2002 || Socorro || LINEAR || H || align=right data-sort-value="0.89" | 890 m || 
|-id=082 bgcolor=#E9E9E9
| 440082 ||  || — || October 4, 2002 || Palomar || NEAT || — || align=right | 2.6 km || 
|-id=083 bgcolor=#E9E9E9
| 440083 ||  || — || August 16, 2002 || Socorro || LINEAR || EUN || align=right | 1.3 km || 
|-id=084 bgcolor=#E9E9E9
| 440084 ||  || — || October 3, 2002 || Palomar || NEAT || JUN || align=right data-sort-value="0.89" | 890 m || 
|-id=085 bgcolor=#E9E9E9
| 440085 ||  || — || September 7, 2002 || Socorro || LINEAR || — || align=right | 2.3 km || 
|-id=086 bgcolor=#fefefe
| 440086 ||  || — || September 5, 2002 || Anderson Mesa || LONEOS || — || align=right data-sort-value="0.75" | 750 m || 
|-id=087 bgcolor=#E9E9E9
| 440087 ||  || — || October 4, 2002 || Socorro || LINEAR || — || align=right | 1.3 km || 
|-id=088 bgcolor=#E9E9E9
| 440088 ||  || — || October 7, 2002 || Socorro || LINEAR || — || align=right | 1.5 km || 
|-id=089 bgcolor=#E9E9E9
| 440089 ||  || — || October 6, 2002 || Socorro || LINEAR || — || align=right | 2.8 km || 
|-id=090 bgcolor=#E9E9E9
| 440090 ||  || — || October 10, 2002 || Socorro || LINEAR || — || align=right | 1.8 km || 
|-id=091 bgcolor=#E9E9E9
| 440091 ||  || — || October 5, 2002 || Apache Point || SDSS || — || align=right | 1.6 km || 
|-id=092 bgcolor=#E9E9E9
| 440092 ||  || — || October 10, 2002 || Apache Point || SDSS || EUN || align=right | 1.1 km || 
|-id=093 bgcolor=#d6d6d6
| 440093 ||  || — || October 10, 2002 || Apache Point || SDSS || 7:4 || align=right | 3.1 km || 
|-id=094 bgcolor=#E9E9E9
| 440094 ||  || — || October 29, 2002 || Apache Point || SDSS || — || align=right | 1.9 km || 
|-id=095 bgcolor=#E9E9E9
| 440095 ||  || — || November 5, 2002 || Socorro || LINEAR || — || align=right | 1.5 km || 
|-id=096 bgcolor=#fefefe
| 440096 ||  || — || November 5, 2002 || Socorro || LINEAR || — || align=right data-sort-value="0.75" | 750 m || 
|-id=097 bgcolor=#E9E9E9
| 440097 ||  || — || November 14, 2002 || Socorro || LINEAR || — || align=right | 2.2 km || 
|-id=098 bgcolor=#E9E9E9
| 440098 ||  || — || December 10, 2002 || Palomar || NEAT || — || align=right | 2.8 km || 
|-id=099 bgcolor=#E9E9E9
| 440099 ||  || — || December 5, 2002 || Socorro || LINEAR || — || align=right | 2.1 km || 
|-id=100 bgcolor=#fefefe
| 440100 ||  || — || December 3, 2002 || Palomar || NEAT || — || align=right data-sort-value="0.68" | 680 m || 
|}

440101–440200 

|-bgcolor=#fefefe
| 440101 ||  || — || January 5, 2003 || Socorro || LINEAR || — || align=right | 1.1 km || 
|-id=102 bgcolor=#fefefe
| 440102 ||  || — || January 7, 2003 || Socorro || LINEAR || H || align=right data-sort-value="0.99" | 990 m || 
|-id=103 bgcolor=#E9E9E9
| 440103 ||  || — || January 8, 2003 || Socorro || LINEAR || — || align=right | 2.1 km || 
|-id=104 bgcolor=#E9E9E9
| 440104 ||  || — || January 26, 2003 || Anderson Mesa || LONEOS || — || align=right | 2.8 km || 
|-id=105 bgcolor=#fefefe
| 440105 ||  || — || January 27, 2003 || Socorro || LINEAR || H || align=right data-sort-value="0.84" | 840 m || 
|-id=106 bgcolor=#fefefe
| 440106 ||  || — || April 6, 2003 || Kitt Peak || Spacewatch || — || align=right data-sort-value="0.76" | 760 m || 
|-id=107 bgcolor=#fefefe
| 440107 ||  || — || April 26, 2003 || Campo Imperatore || CINEOS || — || align=right | 1.0 km || 
|-id=108 bgcolor=#d6d6d6
| 440108 ||  || — || May 22, 2003 || Kitt Peak || Spacewatch || — || align=right | 3.6 km || 
|-id=109 bgcolor=#d6d6d6
| 440109 ||  || — || April 30, 2003 || Kitt Peak || Spacewatch || LIX || align=right | 3.1 km || 
|-id=110 bgcolor=#E9E9E9
| 440110 ||  || — || August 22, 2003 || Campo Imperatore || CINEOS || — || align=right data-sort-value="0.90" | 900 m || 
|-id=111 bgcolor=#E9E9E9
| 440111 ||  || — || September 5, 2003 || Bergisch Gladbach || W. Bickel || — || align=right data-sort-value="0.82" | 820 m || 
|-id=112 bgcolor=#E9E9E9
| 440112 ||  || — || September 17, 2003 || Palomar || NEAT || — || align=right data-sort-value="0.80" | 800 m || 
|-id=113 bgcolor=#E9E9E9
| 440113 ||  || — || September 16, 2003 || Anderson Mesa || LONEOS || — || align=right | 1.5 km || 
|-id=114 bgcolor=#E9E9E9
| 440114 ||  || — || September 16, 2003 || Anderson Mesa || LONEOS || — || align=right data-sort-value="0.79" | 790 m || 
|-id=115 bgcolor=#E9E9E9
| 440115 ||  || — || August 21, 2003 || Campo Imperatore || CINEOS || — || align=right | 1.5 km || 
|-id=116 bgcolor=#E9E9E9
| 440116 ||  || — || September 18, 2003 || Kitt Peak || Spacewatch || — || align=right | 1.1 km || 
|-id=117 bgcolor=#E9E9E9
| 440117 ||  || — || September 19, 2003 || Kitt Peak || Spacewatch || — || align=right | 1.4 km || 
|-id=118 bgcolor=#E9E9E9
| 440118 ||  || — || September 18, 2003 || Kitt Peak || Spacewatch || — || align=right data-sort-value="0.94" | 940 m || 
|-id=119 bgcolor=#E9E9E9
| 440119 ||  || — || September 20, 2003 || Palomar || NEAT || — || align=right data-sort-value="0.73" | 730 m || 
|-id=120 bgcolor=#E9E9E9
| 440120 ||  || — || September 20, 2003 || Palomar || NEAT || — || align=right | 1.0 km || 
|-id=121 bgcolor=#E9E9E9
| 440121 ||  || — || September 20, 2003 || Palomar || NEAT || — || align=right | 1.3 km || 
|-id=122 bgcolor=#E9E9E9
| 440122 ||  || — || September 19, 2003 || Anderson Mesa || LONEOS || — || align=right data-sort-value="0.91" | 910 m || 
|-id=123 bgcolor=#E9E9E9
| 440123 ||  || — || September 21, 2003 || Kitt Peak || Spacewatch || (5) || align=right data-sort-value="0.77" | 770 m || 
|-id=124 bgcolor=#E9E9E9
| 440124 ||  || — || September 25, 2003 || Bergisch Gladbach || W. Bickel || — || align=right data-sort-value="0.68" | 680 m || 
|-id=125 bgcolor=#d6d6d6
| 440125 ||  || — || September 27, 2003 || Kitt Peak || Spacewatch || 7:4 || align=right | 4.0 km || 
|-id=126 bgcolor=#E9E9E9
| 440126 ||  || — || September 28, 2003 || Kitt Peak || Spacewatch || — || align=right data-sort-value="0.75" | 750 m || 
|-id=127 bgcolor=#E9E9E9
| 440127 ||  || — || September 18, 2003 || Campo Imperatore || CINEOS || — || align=right | 1.0 km || 
|-id=128 bgcolor=#E9E9E9
| 440128 ||  || — || September 18, 2003 || Haleakala || NEAT || EUN || align=right | 1.2 km || 
|-id=129 bgcolor=#E9E9E9
| 440129 ||  || — || September 17, 2003 || Palomar || NEAT || EUN || align=right | 1.4 km || 
|-id=130 bgcolor=#E9E9E9
| 440130 ||  || — || September 18, 2003 || Kitt Peak || Spacewatch || — || align=right data-sort-value="0.88" | 880 m || 
|-id=131 bgcolor=#E9E9E9
| 440131 ||  || — || September 22, 2003 || Kitt Peak || Spacewatch || — || align=right data-sort-value="0.68" | 680 m || 
|-id=132 bgcolor=#E9E9E9
| 440132 ||  || — || September 29, 2003 || Apache Point || SDSS || — || align=right data-sort-value="0.68" | 680 m || 
|-id=133 bgcolor=#E9E9E9
| 440133 ||  || — || September 28, 2003 || Apache Point || SDSS || — || align=right | 1.0 km || 
|-id=134 bgcolor=#E9E9E9
| 440134 ||  || — || October 4, 2003 || Kitt Peak || Spacewatch || ADE || align=right | 2.0 km || 
|-id=135 bgcolor=#FA8072
| 440135 ||  || — || October 16, 2003 || Palomar || NEAT || — || align=right data-sort-value="0.82" | 820 m || 
|-id=136 bgcolor=#E9E9E9
| 440136 ||  || — || October 18, 2003 || Kitt Peak || Spacewatch || — || align=right data-sort-value="0.90" | 900 m || 
|-id=137 bgcolor=#E9E9E9
| 440137 ||  || — || October 17, 2003 || Kitt Peak || Spacewatch || — || align=right data-sort-value="0.63" | 630 m || 
|-id=138 bgcolor=#E9E9E9
| 440138 ||  || — || October 16, 2003 || Palomar || NEAT || (5) || align=right data-sort-value="0.80" | 800 m || 
|-id=139 bgcolor=#E9E9E9
| 440139 ||  || — || October 19, 2003 || Palomar || NEAT || — || align=right data-sort-value="0.87" | 870 m || 
|-id=140 bgcolor=#E9E9E9
| 440140 ||  || — || September 28, 2003 || Anderson Mesa || LONEOS || — || align=right | 1.1 km || 
|-id=141 bgcolor=#E9E9E9
| 440141 ||  || — || September 22, 2003 || Socorro || LINEAR || — || align=right data-sort-value="0.77" | 770 m || 
|-id=142 bgcolor=#E9E9E9
| 440142 ||  || — || October 20, 2003 || Socorro || LINEAR || — || align=right data-sort-value="0.94" | 940 m || 
|-id=143 bgcolor=#E9E9E9
| 440143 ||  || — || October 20, 2003 || Kitt Peak || Spacewatch || — || align=right data-sort-value="0.98" | 980 m || 
|-id=144 bgcolor=#E9E9E9
| 440144 ||  || — || October 20, 2003 || Kitt Peak || Spacewatch || — || align=right | 1.1 km || 
|-id=145 bgcolor=#fefefe
| 440145 ||  || — || October 21, 2003 || Palomar || NEAT || critical || align=right data-sort-value="0.49" | 490 m || 
|-id=146 bgcolor=#E9E9E9
| 440146 ||  || — || October 21, 2003 || Palomar || NEAT || — || align=right data-sort-value="0.75" | 750 m || 
|-id=147 bgcolor=#E9E9E9
| 440147 ||  || — || October 21, 2003 || Socorro || LINEAR || critical || align=right data-sort-value="0.78" | 780 m || 
|-id=148 bgcolor=#E9E9E9
| 440148 ||  || — || October 23, 2003 || Kitt Peak || Spacewatch || — || align=right | 1.00 km || 
|-id=149 bgcolor=#E9E9E9
| 440149 ||  || — || October 26, 2003 || Kitt Peak || Spacewatch || EUN || align=right | 1.1 km || 
|-id=150 bgcolor=#E9E9E9
| 440150 ||  || — || October 28, 2003 || Socorro || LINEAR || — || align=right data-sort-value="0.75" | 750 m || 
|-id=151 bgcolor=#E9E9E9
| 440151 ||  || — || October 18, 2003 || Kitt Peak || Spacewatch || — || align=right | 1.1 km || 
|-id=152 bgcolor=#E9E9E9
| 440152 ||  || — || October 23, 2003 || Kitt Peak || Spacewatch || — || align=right data-sort-value="0.76" | 760 m || 
|-id=153 bgcolor=#E9E9E9
| 440153 ||  || — || September 18, 2003 || Kitt Peak || Spacewatch || critical || align=right data-sort-value="0.78" | 780 m || 
|-id=154 bgcolor=#E9E9E9
| 440154 ||  || — || October 18, 2003 || Kitt Peak || Spacewatch || — || align=right data-sort-value="0.74" | 740 m || 
|-id=155 bgcolor=#E9E9E9
| 440155 ||  || — || November 14, 2003 || Palomar || NEAT || (5) || align=right data-sort-value="0.73" | 730 m || 
|-id=156 bgcolor=#E9E9E9
| 440156 ||  || — || October 27, 2003 || Kitt Peak || Spacewatch || critical || align=right data-sort-value="0.65" | 650 m || 
|-id=157 bgcolor=#E9E9E9
| 440157 ||  || — || November 20, 2003 || Socorro || LINEAR || — || align=right | 2.1 km || 
|-id=158 bgcolor=#E9E9E9
| 440158 ||  || — || November 16, 2003 || Kitt Peak || Spacewatch || — || align=right data-sort-value="0.81" | 810 m || 
|-id=159 bgcolor=#E9E9E9
| 440159 ||  || — || November 18, 2003 || Palomar || NEAT || — || align=right | 1.3 km || 
|-id=160 bgcolor=#E9E9E9
| 440160 ||  || — || November 18, 2003 || Palomar || NEAT || — || align=right | 1.0 km || 
|-id=161 bgcolor=#E9E9E9
| 440161 ||  || — || October 25, 2003 || Kitt Peak || Spacewatch || EUN || align=right | 1.1 km || 
|-id=162 bgcolor=#E9E9E9
| 440162 ||  || — || November 20, 2003 || Socorro || LINEAR || — || align=right | 2.4 km || 
|-id=163 bgcolor=#E9E9E9
| 440163 ||  || — || November 19, 2003 || Kitt Peak || Spacewatch || — || align=right | 2.6 km || 
|-id=164 bgcolor=#E9E9E9
| 440164 ||  || — || November 19, 2003 || Kitt Peak || Spacewatch || — || align=right data-sort-value="0.81" | 810 m || 
|-id=165 bgcolor=#E9E9E9
| 440165 ||  || — || November 20, 2003 || Socorro || LINEAR || — || align=right data-sort-value="0.92" | 920 m || 
|-id=166 bgcolor=#E9E9E9
| 440166 ||  || — || November 20, 2003 || Socorro || LINEAR || — || align=right data-sort-value="0.83" | 830 m || 
|-id=167 bgcolor=#E9E9E9
| 440167 ||  || — || November 20, 2003 || Socorro || LINEAR || — || align=right | 1.2 km || 
|-id=168 bgcolor=#E9E9E9
| 440168 ||  || — || November 23, 2003 || Socorro || LINEAR || — || align=right | 1.7 km || 
|-id=169 bgcolor=#E9E9E9
| 440169 ||  || — || November 23, 2003 || Kitt Peak || M. W. Buie || — || align=right data-sort-value="0.90" | 900 m || 
|-id=170 bgcolor=#E9E9E9
| 440170 ||  || — || December 1, 2003 || Socorro || LINEAR || — || align=right | 1.1 km || 
|-id=171 bgcolor=#E9E9E9
| 440171 ||  || — || December 19, 2003 || Socorro || LINEAR || — || align=right | 1.2 km || 
|-id=172 bgcolor=#E9E9E9
| 440172 ||  || — || December 19, 2003 || Socorro || LINEAR || — || align=right | 1.6 km || 
|-id=173 bgcolor=#E9E9E9
| 440173 ||  || — || December 28, 2003 || Socorro || LINEAR || — || align=right | 2.9 km || 
|-id=174 bgcolor=#FA8072
| 440174 ||  || — || December 27, 2003 || Kitt Peak || Spacewatch || — || align=right data-sort-value="0.65" | 650 m || 
|-id=175 bgcolor=#E9E9E9
| 440175 ||  || — || December 28, 2003 || Socorro || LINEAR || — || align=right | 1.8 km || 
|-id=176 bgcolor=#E9E9E9
| 440176 ||  || — || December 17, 2003 || Socorro || LINEAR || — || align=right | 1.1 km || 
|-id=177 bgcolor=#E9E9E9
| 440177 ||  || — || January 17, 2004 || Kitt Peak || Spacewatch || — || align=right | 2.0 km || 
|-id=178 bgcolor=#E9E9E9
| 440178 ||  || — || January 19, 2004 || Kitt Peak || Spacewatch || — || align=right | 1.4 km || 
|-id=179 bgcolor=#FA8072
| 440179 ||  || — || January 22, 2004 || Socorro || LINEAR || — || align=right | 2.0 km || 
|-id=180 bgcolor=#E9E9E9
| 440180 ||  || — || January 22, 2004 || Socorro || LINEAR || — || align=right | 1.3 km || 
|-id=181 bgcolor=#fefefe
| 440181 ||  || — || January 28, 2004 || Socorro || LINEAR || — || align=right | 1.1 km || 
|-id=182 bgcolor=#fefefe
| 440182 ||  || — || February 11, 2004 || Kitt Peak || Spacewatch || H || align=right data-sort-value="0.75" | 750 m || 
|-id=183 bgcolor=#E9E9E9
| 440183 ||  || — || February 13, 2004 || Desert Eagle || W. K. Y. Yeung || — || align=right | 3.0 km || 
|-id=184 bgcolor=#E9E9E9
| 440184 ||  || — || December 22, 2003 || Kitt Peak || Spacewatch || — || align=right | 1.9 km || 
|-id=185 bgcolor=#E9E9E9
| 440185 ||  || — || February 11, 2004 || Kitt Peak || Spacewatch || — || align=right | 1.8 km || 
|-id=186 bgcolor=#E9E9E9
| 440186 ||  || — || January 30, 2004 || Socorro || LINEAR || — || align=right | 2.3 km || 
|-id=187 bgcolor=#d6d6d6
| 440187 ||  || — || January 30, 2004 || Anderson Mesa || LONEOS || BRA || align=right | 2.0 km || 
|-id=188 bgcolor=#E9E9E9
| 440188 ||  || — || February 14, 2004 || Kitt Peak || Spacewatch || DOR || align=right | 2.3 km || 
|-id=189 bgcolor=#E9E9E9
| 440189 ||  || — || February 16, 2004 || Kitt Peak || Spacewatch || GEF || align=right | 1.2 km || 
|-id=190 bgcolor=#E9E9E9
| 440190 ||  || — || March 14, 2004 || Catalina || CSS || — || align=right | 2.7 km || 
|-id=191 bgcolor=#fefefe
| 440191 ||  || — || March 16, 2004 || Socorro || LINEAR || H || align=right data-sort-value="0.71" | 710 m || 
|-id=192 bgcolor=#fefefe
| 440192 ||  || — || March 20, 2004 || Socorro || LINEAR || H || align=right data-sort-value="0.89" | 890 m || 
|-id=193 bgcolor=#fefefe
| 440193 ||  || — || February 18, 2004 || Socorro || LINEAR || H || align=right data-sort-value="0.89" | 890 m || 
|-id=194 bgcolor=#d6d6d6
| 440194 ||  || — || March 16, 2004 || Socorro || LINEAR || — || align=right | 3.3 km || 
|-id=195 bgcolor=#fefefe
| 440195 ||  || — || March 25, 2004 || Socorro || LINEAR || — || align=right data-sort-value="0.94" | 940 m || 
|-id=196 bgcolor=#d6d6d6
| 440196 ||  || — || March 17, 2004 || Kitt Peak || Spacewatch || 3:2 || align=right | 4.8 km || 
|-id=197 bgcolor=#fefefe
| 440197 ||  || — || March 29, 2004 || Kitt Peak || Spacewatch || — || align=right data-sort-value="0.59" | 590 m || 
|-id=198 bgcolor=#fefefe
| 440198 ||  || — || April 12, 2004 || Socorro || LINEAR || H || align=right data-sort-value="0.81" | 810 m || 
|-id=199 bgcolor=#d6d6d6
| 440199 ||  || — || April 15, 2004 || Siding Spring || SSS || — || align=right | 2.8 km || 
|-id=200 bgcolor=#fefefe
| 440200 ||  || — || March 23, 2004 || Socorro || LINEAR || — || align=right data-sort-value="0.80" | 800 m || 
|}

440201–440300 

|-bgcolor=#fefefe
| 440201 ||  || — || April 19, 2004 || Kitt Peak || Spacewatch || — || align=right data-sort-value="0.90" | 900 m || 
|-id=202 bgcolor=#fefefe
| 440202 ||  || — || March 29, 2004 || Siding Spring || SSS || H || align=right data-sort-value="0.82" | 820 m || 
|-id=203 bgcolor=#d6d6d6
| 440203 ||  || — || March 28, 2004 || Catalina || CSS || — || align=right | 2.3 km || 
|-id=204 bgcolor=#d6d6d6
| 440204 ||  || — || May 15, 2004 || Socorro || LINEAR || — || align=right | 2.2 km || 
|-id=205 bgcolor=#fefefe
| 440205 ||  || — || June 13, 2004 || Kitt Peak || Spacewatch || — || align=right data-sort-value="0.94" | 940 m || 
|-id=206 bgcolor=#fefefe
| 440206 ||  || — || July 9, 2004 || Socorro || LINEAR || — || align=right data-sort-value="0.97" | 970 m || 
|-id=207 bgcolor=#d6d6d6
| 440207 ||  || — || July 11, 2004 || Socorro || LINEAR || — || align=right | 2.1 km || 
|-id=208 bgcolor=#d6d6d6
| 440208 ||  || — || July 11, 2004 || Socorro || LINEAR || — || align=right | 3.1 km || 
|-id=209 bgcolor=#fefefe
| 440209 ||  || — || July 11, 2004 || Socorro || LINEAR || — || align=right data-sort-value="0.85" | 850 m || 
|-id=210 bgcolor=#d6d6d6
| 440210 ||  || — || July 10, 2004 || Catalina || CSS || — || align=right | 4.8 km || 
|-id=211 bgcolor=#fefefe
| 440211 ||  || — || July 15, 2004 || Siding Spring || SSS || — || align=right | 1.1 km || 
|-id=212 bgcolor=#FFC2E0
| 440212 ||  || — || July 16, 2004 || Socorro || LINEAR || APOPHA || align=right data-sort-value="0.60" | 600 m || 
|-id=213 bgcolor=#fefefe
| 440213 ||  || — || July 18, 2004 || Reedy Creek || J. Broughton || (5026) || align=right data-sort-value="0.89" | 890 m || 
|-id=214 bgcolor=#d6d6d6
| 440214 ||  || — || July 21, 2004 || Reedy Creek || J. Broughton || — || align=right | 4.7 km || 
|-id=215 bgcolor=#fefefe
| 440215 ||  || — || August 6, 2004 || Palomar || NEAT || — || align=right data-sort-value="0.88" | 880 m || 
|-id=216 bgcolor=#fefefe
| 440216 ||  || — || August 6, 2004 || Palomar || NEAT || V || align=right data-sort-value="0.87" | 870 m || 
|-id=217 bgcolor=#fefefe
| 440217 ||  || — || August 7, 2004 || Palomar || NEAT || — || align=right data-sort-value="0.81" | 810 m || 
|-id=218 bgcolor=#d6d6d6
| 440218 ||  || — || August 8, 2004 || Palomar || NEAT || — || align=right | 2.3 km || 
|-id=219 bgcolor=#fefefe
| 440219 ||  || — || August 8, 2004 || Anderson Mesa || LONEOS || NYS || align=right data-sort-value="0.79" | 790 m || 
|-id=220 bgcolor=#fefefe
| 440220 ||  || — || August 9, 2004 || Socorro || LINEAR || — || align=right data-sort-value="0.82" | 820 m || 
|-id=221 bgcolor=#fefefe
| 440221 ||  || — || August 8, 2004 || Socorro || LINEAR || — || align=right data-sort-value="0.96" | 960 m || 
|-id=222 bgcolor=#fefefe
| 440222 ||  || — || August 8, 2004 || Anderson Mesa || LONEOS || — || align=right | 2.9 km || 
|-id=223 bgcolor=#fefefe
| 440223 ||  || — || August 9, 2004 || Socorro || LINEAR || H || align=right data-sort-value="0.56" | 560 m || 
|-id=224 bgcolor=#fefefe
| 440224 ||  || — || August 10, 2004 || Socorro || LINEAR || — || align=right data-sort-value="0.70" | 700 m || 
|-id=225 bgcolor=#d6d6d6
| 440225 ||  || — || August 10, 2004 || Socorro || LINEAR || — || align=right | 3.5 km || 
|-id=226 bgcolor=#d6d6d6
| 440226 ||  || — || August 10, 2004 || Campo Imperatore || CINEOS || — || align=right | 3.0 km || 
|-id=227 bgcolor=#fefefe
| 440227 ||  || — || August 8, 2004 || Socorro || LINEAR || NYS || align=right data-sort-value="0.76" | 760 m || 
|-id=228 bgcolor=#d6d6d6
| 440228 ||  || — || July 27, 2004 || Socorro || LINEAR || — || align=right | 3.3 km || 
|-id=229 bgcolor=#d6d6d6
| 440229 ||  || — || June 23, 2004 || Siding Spring || SSS || — || align=right | 3.0 km || 
|-id=230 bgcolor=#d6d6d6
| 440230 ||  || — || August 10, 2004 || Socorro || LINEAR || — || align=right | 3.9 km || 
|-id=231 bgcolor=#d6d6d6
| 440231 ||  || — || August 22, 2004 || Kitt Peak || Spacewatch || — || align=right | 2.9 km || 
|-id=232 bgcolor=#fefefe
| 440232 ||  || — || August 23, 2004 || Goodricke-Pigott || Goodricke-Pigott Obs. || — || align=right data-sort-value="0.90" | 900 m || 
|-id=233 bgcolor=#d6d6d6
| 440233 ||  || — || August 23, 2004 || Kitt Peak || Spacewatch || EOS || align=right | 2.4 km || 
|-id=234 bgcolor=#fefefe
| 440234 ||  || — || August 23, 2004 || Kitt Peak || Spacewatch || — || align=right data-sort-value="0.82" | 820 m || 
|-id=235 bgcolor=#d6d6d6
| 440235 ||  || — || August 25, 2004 || Socorro || LINEAR || — || align=right | 5.2 km || 
|-id=236 bgcolor=#d6d6d6
| 440236 ||  || — || August 25, 2004 || Socorro || LINEAR || — || align=right | 6.3 km || 
|-id=237 bgcolor=#fefefe
| 440237 ||  || — || August 21, 2004 || Catalina || CSS || MAS || align=right data-sort-value="0.86" | 860 m || 
|-id=238 bgcolor=#fefefe
| 440238 ||  || — || August 25, 2004 || Kitt Peak || Spacewatch || — || align=right data-sort-value="0.80" | 800 m || 
|-id=239 bgcolor=#d6d6d6
| 440239 ||  || — || September 6, 2004 || Socorro || LINEAR || — || align=right | 6.0 km || 
|-id=240 bgcolor=#d6d6d6
| 440240 ||  || — || September 6, 2004 || Socorro || LINEAR || — || align=right | 5.0 km || 
|-id=241 bgcolor=#d6d6d6
| 440241 ||  || — || September 7, 2004 || Eskridge || Farpoint Obs. || — || align=right | 2.6 km || 
|-id=242 bgcolor=#FA8072
| 440242 ||  || — || September 7, 2004 || Socorro || LINEAR || — || align=right data-sort-value="0.71" | 710 m || 
|-id=243 bgcolor=#FA8072
| 440243 ||  || — || September 7, 2004 || Socorro || LINEAR || — || align=right | 1.2 km || 
|-id=244 bgcolor=#fefefe
| 440244 ||  || — || September 4, 2004 || Palomar || NEAT || NYS || align=right data-sort-value="0.72" | 720 m || 
|-id=245 bgcolor=#fefefe
| 440245 ||  || — || September 6, 2004 || Siding Spring || SSS || — || align=right data-sort-value="0.82" | 820 m || 
|-id=246 bgcolor=#fefefe
| 440246 ||  || — || September 6, 2004 || Siding Spring || SSS || — || align=right data-sort-value="0.82" | 820 m || 
|-id=247 bgcolor=#fefefe
| 440247 ||  || — || September 7, 2004 || Socorro || LINEAR || — || align=right data-sort-value="0.85" | 850 m || 
|-id=248 bgcolor=#fefefe
| 440248 ||  || — || September 7, 2004 || Kitt Peak || Spacewatch || — || align=right data-sort-value="0.72" | 720 m || 
|-id=249 bgcolor=#fefefe
| 440249 ||  || — || September 7, 2004 || Kitt Peak || Spacewatch || NYS || align=right data-sort-value="0.66" | 660 m || 
|-id=250 bgcolor=#fefefe
| 440250 ||  || — || September 7, 2004 || Kitt Peak || Spacewatch || NYS || align=right data-sort-value="0.69" | 690 m || 
|-id=251 bgcolor=#d6d6d6
| 440251 ||  || — || August 19, 2004 || Socorro || LINEAR || — || align=right | 3.9 km || 
|-id=252 bgcolor=#fefefe
| 440252 ||  || — || September 8, 2004 || Socorro || LINEAR || NYS || align=right data-sort-value="0.69" | 690 m || 
|-id=253 bgcolor=#d6d6d6
| 440253 ||  || — || September 8, 2004 || Socorro || LINEAR || EOS || align=right | 2.2 km || 
|-id=254 bgcolor=#FA8072
| 440254 ||  || — || September 8, 2004 || Socorro || LINEAR || — || align=right data-sort-value="0.96" | 960 m || 
|-id=255 bgcolor=#fefefe
| 440255 ||  || — || September 8, 2004 || Socorro || LINEAR || — || align=right data-sort-value="0.65" | 650 m || 
|-id=256 bgcolor=#d6d6d6
| 440256 ||  || — || September 8, 2004 || Socorro || LINEAR || — || align=right | 2.6 km || 
|-id=257 bgcolor=#fefefe
| 440257 ||  || — || September 8, 2004 || Socorro || LINEAR || — || align=right data-sort-value="0.82" | 820 m || 
|-id=258 bgcolor=#fefefe
| 440258 ||  || — || September 9, 2004 || Socorro || LINEAR || — || align=right data-sort-value="0.78" | 780 m || 
|-id=259 bgcolor=#fefefe
| 440259 ||  || — || September 7, 2004 || Kitt Peak || Spacewatch || NYS || align=right data-sort-value="0.59" | 590 m || 
|-id=260 bgcolor=#fefefe
| 440260 ||  || — || September 8, 2004 || Socorro || LINEAR || — || align=right data-sort-value="0.78" | 780 m || 
|-id=261 bgcolor=#fefefe
| 440261 ||  || — || September 8, 2004 || Socorro || LINEAR || — || align=right data-sort-value="0.94" | 940 m || 
|-id=262 bgcolor=#fefefe
| 440262 ||  || — || September 8, 2004 || Socorro || LINEAR || — || align=right data-sort-value="0.86" | 860 m || 
|-id=263 bgcolor=#fefefe
| 440263 ||  || — || September 8, 2004 || Socorro || LINEAR || — || align=right | 1.0 km || 
|-id=264 bgcolor=#fefefe
| 440264 ||  || — || September 8, 2004 || Socorro || LINEAR || — || align=right data-sort-value="0.78" | 780 m || 
|-id=265 bgcolor=#d6d6d6
| 440265 ||  || — || September 8, 2004 || Palomar || NEAT || — || align=right | 5.1 km || 
|-id=266 bgcolor=#fefefe
| 440266 ||  || — || September 9, 2004 || Socorro || LINEAR || — || align=right data-sort-value="0.97" | 970 m || 
|-id=267 bgcolor=#d6d6d6
| 440267 ||  || — || September 6, 2004 || Socorro || LINEAR || — || align=right | 3.3 km || 
|-id=268 bgcolor=#d6d6d6
| 440268 ||  || — || August 20, 2004 || Catalina || CSS || TIR || align=right | 3.8 km || 
|-id=269 bgcolor=#d6d6d6
| 440269 ||  || — || September 7, 2004 || Kitt Peak || Spacewatch || — || align=right | 3.0 km || 
|-id=270 bgcolor=#d6d6d6
| 440270 ||  || — || September 7, 2004 || Kitt Peak || Spacewatch || — || align=right | 2.4 km || 
|-id=271 bgcolor=#d6d6d6
| 440271 ||  || — || September 7, 2004 || Kitt Peak || Spacewatch || VER || align=right | 2.6 km || 
|-id=272 bgcolor=#fefefe
| 440272 ||  || — || September 8, 2004 || Socorro || LINEAR || — || align=right data-sort-value="0.71" | 710 m || 
|-id=273 bgcolor=#fefefe
| 440273 ||  || — || September 8, 2004 || Socorro || LINEAR || NYS || align=right data-sort-value="0.76" | 760 m || 
|-id=274 bgcolor=#fefefe
| 440274 ||  || — || September 8, 2004 || Socorro || LINEAR || NYS || align=right data-sort-value="0.72" | 720 m || 
|-id=275 bgcolor=#fefefe
| 440275 ||  || — || September 10, 2004 || Socorro || LINEAR || — || align=right data-sort-value="0.78" | 780 m || 
|-id=276 bgcolor=#fefefe
| 440276 ||  || — || September 10, 2004 || Socorro || LINEAR || — || align=right data-sort-value="0.83" | 830 m || 
|-id=277 bgcolor=#d6d6d6
| 440277 ||  || — || September 10, 2004 || Altschwendt || W. Ries || — || align=right | 3.3 km || 
|-id=278 bgcolor=#fefefe
| 440278 ||  || — || September 8, 2004 || Socorro || LINEAR || — || align=right data-sort-value="0.71" | 710 m || 
|-id=279 bgcolor=#d6d6d6
| 440279 ||  || — || August 25, 2004 || Kitt Peak || Spacewatch || — || align=right | 3.3 km || 
|-id=280 bgcolor=#d6d6d6
| 440280 ||  || — || September 10, 2004 || Socorro || LINEAR || — || align=right | 4.3 km || 
|-id=281 bgcolor=#d6d6d6
| 440281 ||  || — || September 10, 2004 || Socorro || LINEAR || — || align=right | 3.6 km || 
|-id=282 bgcolor=#fefefe
| 440282 ||  || — || September 10, 2004 || Socorro || LINEAR || — || align=right data-sort-value="0.96" | 960 m || 
|-id=283 bgcolor=#fefefe
| 440283 ||  || — || September 12, 2004 || Kitt Peak || Spacewatch || — || align=right data-sort-value="0.95" | 950 m || 
|-id=284 bgcolor=#fefefe
| 440284 ||  || — || September 12, 2004 || Kitt Peak || Spacewatch || — || align=right | 1.0 km || 
|-id=285 bgcolor=#d6d6d6
| 440285 ||  || — || September 11, 2004 || Socorro || LINEAR || — || align=right | 3.7 km || 
|-id=286 bgcolor=#d6d6d6
| 440286 ||  || — || September 11, 2004 || Socorro || LINEAR || — || align=right | 3.3 km || 
|-id=287 bgcolor=#d6d6d6
| 440287 ||  || — || September 11, 2004 || Socorro || LINEAR || — || align=right | 3.2 km || 
|-id=288 bgcolor=#d6d6d6
| 440288 ||  || — || September 11, 2004 || Socorro || LINEAR || 7:4 || align=right | 2.8 km || 
|-id=289 bgcolor=#FA8072
| 440289 ||  || — || September 11, 2004 || Socorro || LINEAR || — || align=right | 1.3 km || 
|-id=290 bgcolor=#d6d6d6
| 440290 ||  || — || September 11, 2004 || Socorro || LINEAR || — || align=right | 3.4 km || 
|-id=291 bgcolor=#fefefe
| 440291 ||  || — || September 9, 2004 || Ottmarsheim || Ottmarsheim Obs. || — || align=right | 1.00 km || 
|-id=292 bgcolor=#d6d6d6
| 440292 ||  || — || September 9, 2004 || Socorro || LINEAR || — || align=right | 2.9 km || 
|-id=293 bgcolor=#fefefe
| 440293 ||  || — || September 9, 2004 || Kitt Peak || Spacewatch || — || align=right data-sort-value="0.82" | 820 m || 
|-id=294 bgcolor=#fefefe
| 440294 ||  || — || September 9, 2004 || Kitt Peak || Spacewatch || V || align=right data-sort-value="0.63" | 630 m || 
|-id=295 bgcolor=#d6d6d6
| 440295 ||  || — || September 10, 2004 || Socorro || LINEAR || — || align=right | 3.1 km || 
|-id=296 bgcolor=#fefefe
| 440296 ||  || — || September 10, 2004 || Kitt Peak || Spacewatch || — || align=right data-sort-value="0.65" | 650 m || 
|-id=297 bgcolor=#d6d6d6
| 440297 ||  || — || September 12, 2004 || Socorro || LINEAR || — || align=right | 3.9 km || 
|-id=298 bgcolor=#d6d6d6
| 440298 ||  || — || August 11, 2004 || Socorro || LINEAR || — || align=right | 3.3 km || 
|-id=299 bgcolor=#d6d6d6
| 440299 ||  || — || September 11, 2004 || Kitt Peak || Spacewatch || — || align=right | 2.4 km || 
|-id=300 bgcolor=#fefefe
| 440300 ||  || — || September 11, 2004 || Kitt Peak || Spacewatch || — || align=right data-sort-value="0.67" | 670 m || 
|}

440301–440400 

|-bgcolor=#fefefe
| 440301 ||  || — || September 15, 2004 || Kitt Peak || Spacewatch || NYS || align=right data-sort-value="0.66" | 660 m || 
|-id=302 bgcolor=#fefefe
| 440302 ||  || — || September 15, 2004 || Kitt Peak || Spacewatch || — || align=right data-sort-value="0.68" | 680 m || 
|-id=303 bgcolor=#fefefe
| 440303 ||  || — || September 13, 2004 || Socorro || LINEAR || — || align=right data-sort-value="0.89" | 890 m || 
|-id=304 bgcolor=#d6d6d6
| 440304 ||  || — || September 12, 2004 || Kitt Peak || Spacewatch || — || align=right | 2.3 km || 
|-id=305 bgcolor=#fefefe
| 440305 ||  || — || September 13, 2004 || Socorro || LINEAR || — || align=right data-sort-value="0.86" | 860 m || 
|-id=306 bgcolor=#fefefe
| 440306 ||  || — || September 13, 2004 || Palomar || NEAT || V || align=right data-sort-value="0.69" | 690 m || 
|-id=307 bgcolor=#d6d6d6
| 440307 ||  || — || September 15, 2004 || Anderson Mesa || LONEOS || — || align=right | 2.8 km || 
|-id=308 bgcolor=#fefefe
| 440308 ||  || — || September 15, 2004 || Kitt Peak || Spacewatch || NYS || align=right data-sort-value="0.58" | 580 m || 
|-id=309 bgcolor=#d6d6d6
| 440309 ||  || — || September 6, 2004 || Siding Spring || SSS || — || align=right | 2.5 km || 
|-id=310 bgcolor=#d6d6d6
| 440310 ||  || — || September 17, 2004 || Socorro || LINEAR || — || align=right | 4.6 km || 
|-id=311 bgcolor=#fefefe
| 440311 ||  || — || September 17, 2004 || Kitt Peak || Spacewatch || V || align=right data-sort-value="0.60" | 600 m || 
|-id=312 bgcolor=#d6d6d6
| 440312 ||  || — || September 18, 2004 || Socorro || LINEAR || LIX || align=right | 3.5 km || 
|-id=313 bgcolor=#fefefe
| 440313 ||  || — || September 22, 2004 || Socorro || LINEAR || — || align=right data-sort-value="0.86" | 860 m || 
|-id=314 bgcolor=#d6d6d6
| 440314 ||  || — || September 22, 2004 || Kitt Peak || Spacewatch || — || align=right | 2.7 km || 
|-id=315 bgcolor=#d6d6d6
| 440315 ||  || — || September 9, 2004 || Socorro || LINEAR || LIX || align=right | 3.5 km || 
|-id=316 bgcolor=#d6d6d6
| 440316 ||  || — || October 4, 2004 || Kitt Peak || Spacewatch || — || align=right | 2.6 km || 
|-id=317 bgcolor=#fefefe
| 440317 ||  || — || October 4, 2004 || Kitt Peak || Spacewatch || NYS || align=right data-sort-value="0.56" | 560 m || 
|-id=318 bgcolor=#fefefe
| 440318 ||  || — || September 15, 2004 || Kitt Peak || Spacewatch || — || align=right data-sort-value="0.75" | 750 m || 
|-id=319 bgcolor=#d6d6d6
| 440319 ||  || — || October 4, 2004 || Kitt Peak || Spacewatch || — || align=right | 3.9 km || 
|-id=320 bgcolor=#fefefe
| 440320 ||  || — || October 4, 2004 || Kitt Peak || Spacewatch || MAS || align=right data-sort-value="0.71" | 710 m || 
|-id=321 bgcolor=#fefefe
| 440321 ||  || — || October 5, 2004 || Kitt Peak || Spacewatch || — || align=right data-sort-value="0.95" | 950 m || 
|-id=322 bgcolor=#fefefe
| 440322 ||  || — || September 9, 2004 || Socorro || LINEAR || — || align=right data-sort-value="0.78" | 780 m || 
|-id=323 bgcolor=#d6d6d6
| 440323 ||  || — || September 14, 2004 || Anderson Mesa || LONEOS || — || align=right | 3.2 km || 
|-id=324 bgcolor=#fefefe
| 440324 ||  || — || September 17, 2004 || Kitt Peak || Spacewatch || — || align=right data-sort-value="0.86" | 860 m || 
|-id=325 bgcolor=#fefefe
| 440325 ||  || — || October 5, 2004 || Kitt Peak || Spacewatch || (6769) || align=right data-sort-value="0.78" | 780 m || 
|-id=326 bgcolor=#fefefe
| 440326 ||  || — || September 16, 2004 || Anderson Mesa || LONEOS || — || align=right data-sort-value="0.82" | 820 m || 
|-id=327 bgcolor=#fefefe
| 440327 ||  || — || September 17, 2004 || Socorro || LINEAR || — || align=right data-sort-value="0.90" | 900 m || 
|-id=328 bgcolor=#d6d6d6
| 440328 ||  || — || October 7, 2004 || Palomar || NEAT || — || align=right | 3.5 km || 
|-id=329 bgcolor=#fefefe
| 440329 ||  || — || October 15, 2004 || Goodricke-Pigott || Goodricke-Pigott Obs. || — || align=right data-sort-value="0.86" | 860 m || 
|-id=330 bgcolor=#fefefe
| 440330 ||  || — || October 5, 2004 || Palomar || NEAT || — || align=right | 1.3 km || 
|-id=331 bgcolor=#fefefe
| 440331 ||  || — || October 7, 2004 || Socorro || LINEAR || MAS || align=right data-sort-value="0.81" | 810 m || 
|-id=332 bgcolor=#d6d6d6
| 440332 ||  || — || October 7, 2004 || Socorro || LINEAR || — || align=right | 2.9 km || 
|-id=333 bgcolor=#fefefe
| 440333 ||  || — || October 7, 2004 || Socorro || LINEAR || MAS || align=right data-sort-value="0.82" | 820 m || 
|-id=334 bgcolor=#fefefe
| 440334 ||  || — || October 7, 2004 || Socorro || LINEAR || — || align=right | 2.1 km || 
|-id=335 bgcolor=#fefefe
| 440335 ||  || — || September 17, 2004 || Socorro || LINEAR || — || align=right data-sort-value="0.82" | 820 m || 
|-id=336 bgcolor=#fefefe
| 440336 ||  || — || October 6, 2004 || Kitt Peak || Spacewatch || MAS || align=right data-sort-value="0.78" | 780 m || 
|-id=337 bgcolor=#d6d6d6
| 440337 ||  || — || September 12, 2004 || Socorro || LINEAR || — || align=right | 3.9 km || 
|-id=338 bgcolor=#d6d6d6
| 440338 ||  || — || September 24, 2004 || Kitt Peak || Spacewatch || — || align=right | 2.9 km || 
|-id=339 bgcolor=#fefefe
| 440339 ||  || — || September 17, 2004 || Kitt Peak || Spacewatch || — || align=right data-sort-value="0.74" | 740 m || 
|-id=340 bgcolor=#fefefe
| 440340 ||  || — || October 7, 2004 || Kitt Peak || Spacewatch || — || align=right data-sort-value="0.83" | 830 m || 
|-id=341 bgcolor=#fefefe
| 440341 ||  || — || October 8, 2004 || Kitt Peak || Spacewatch || — || align=right data-sort-value="0.68" | 680 m || 
|-id=342 bgcolor=#d6d6d6
| 440342 ||  || — || October 9, 2004 || Kitt Peak || Spacewatch || — || align=right | 4.3 km || 
|-id=343 bgcolor=#fefefe
| 440343 ||  || — || September 18, 2004 || Socorro || LINEAR || NYS || align=right data-sort-value="0.76" | 760 m || 
|-id=344 bgcolor=#d6d6d6
| 440344 ||  || — || October 8, 2004 || Kitt Peak || Spacewatch || VER || align=right | 2.7 km || 
|-id=345 bgcolor=#fefefe
| 440345 ||  || — || October 8, 2004 || Kitt Peak || Spacewatch || — || align=right data-sort-value="0.65" | 650 m || 
|-id=346 bgcolor=#d6d6d6
| 440346 ||  || — || September 10, 2004 || Kitt Peak || Spacewatch || — || align=right | 4.4 km || 
|-id=347 bgcolor=#fefefe
| 440347 ||  || — || October 9, 2004 || Kitt Peak || Spacewatch || NYS || align=right data-sort-value="0.70" | 700 m || 
|-id=348 bgcolor=#fefefe
| 440348 ||  || — || October 9, 2004 || Kitt Peak || Spacewatch || — || align=right data-sort-value="0.85" | 850 m || 
|-id=349 bgcolor=#d6d6d6
| 440349 ||  || — || October 10, 2004 || Kitt Peak || Spacewatch || — || align=right | 3.8 km || 
|-id=350 bgcolor=#fefefe
| 440350 ||  || — || October 10, 2004 || Kitt Peak || Spacewatch || — || align=right data-sort-value="0.68" | 680 m || 
|-id=351 bgcolor=#fefefe
| 440351 ||  || — || October 11, 2004 || Kitt Peak || Spacewatch || — || align=right | 1.2 km || 
|-id=352 bgcolor=#d6d6d6
| 440352 ||  || — || September 11, 2004 || Socorro || LINEAR || — || align=right | 4.2 km || 
|-id=353 bgcolor=#d6d6d6
| 440353 ||  || — || October 13, 2004 || Kitt Peak || Spacewatch || — || align=right | 2.2 km || 
|-id=354 bgcolor=#fefefe
| 440354 ||  || — || October 10, 2004 || Kitt Peak || M. W. Buie || NYS || align=right data-sort-value="0.72" | 720 m || 
|-id=355 bgcolor=#fefefe
| 440355 ||  || — || October 11, 2004 || Kitt Peak || M. W. Buie || — || align=right data-sort-value="0.68" | 680 m || 
|-id=356 bgcolor=#fefefe
| 440356 ||  || — || October 13, 2004 || Kitt Peak || Spacewatch || NYS || align=right data-sort-value="0.66" | 660 m || 
|-id=357 bgcolor=#d6d6d6
| 440357 ||  || — || October 6, 2004 || Kitt Peak || Spacewatch || — || align=right | 2.9 km || 
|-id=358 bgcolor=#d6d6d6
| 440358 ||  || — || November 3, 2004 || Catalina || CSS || — || align=right | 4.4 km || 
|-id=359 bgcolor=#d6d6d6
| 440359 ||  || — || October 9, 2004 || Kitt Peak || Spacewatch || — || align=right | 3.4 km || 
|-id=360 bgcolor=#E9E9E9
| 440360 ||  || — || December 7, 2004 || Socorro || LINEAR || — || align=right | 1.4 km || 
|-id=361 bgcolor=#E9E9E9
| 440361 ||  || — || December 9, 2004 || Vail-Jarnac || Jarnac Obs. || — || align=right | 3.4 km || 
|-id=362 bgcolor=#fefefe
| 440362 ||  || — || December 10, 2004 || Kitt Peak || Spacewatch || — || align=right data-sort-value="0.94" | 940 m || 
|-id=363 bgcolor=#d6d6d6
| 440363 ||  || — || November 20, 2004 || Kitt Peak || Spacewatch || Tj (2.99) || align=right | 5.7 km || 
|-id=364 bgcolor=#E9E9E9
| 440364 ||  || — || December 10, 2004 || Kitt Peak || Spacewatch || — || align=right | 1.1 km || 
|-id=365 bgcolor=#fefefe
| 440365 ||  || — || December 10, 2004 || Kitt Peak || Spacewatch || — || align=right | 1.4 km || 
|-id=366 bgcolor=#E9E9E9
| 440366 ||  || — || December 10, 2004 || Socorro || LINEAR || — || align=right | 3.0 km || 
|-id=367 bgcolor=#E9E9E9
| 440367 ||  || — || December 9, 2004 || Catalina || CSS || — || align=right | 1.5 km || 
|-id=368 bgcolor=#E9E9E9
| 440368 ||  || — || December 9, 2004 || Catalina || CSS || — || align=right | 1.2 km || 
|-id=369 bgcolor=#E9E9E9
| 440369 ||  || — || January 7, 2005 || Socorro || LINEAR || — || align=right data-sort-value="0.98" | 980 m || 
|-id=370 bgcolor=#E9E9E9
| 440370 ||  || — || January 6, 2005 || Socorro || LINEAR || — || align=right | 2.3 km || 
|-id=371 bgcolor=#E9E9E9
| 440371 ||  || — || January 7, 2005 || Socorro || LINEAR || — || align=right | 1.2 km || 
|-id=372 bgcolor=#E9E9E9
| 440372 ||  || — || January 9, 2005 || Catalina || CSS || — || align=right | 1.5 km || 
|-id=373 bgcolor=#E9E9E9
| 440373 ||  || — || January 15, 2005 || Kitt Peak || Spacewatch || — || align=right data-sort-value="0.97" | 970 m || 
|-id=374 bgcolor=#E9E9E9
| 440374 ||  || — || January 31, 2005 || Palomar || NEAT || — || align=right | 1.0 km || 
|-id=375 bgcolor=#E9E9E9
| 440375 ||  || — || January 16, 2005 || Catalina || CSS || — || align=right | 1.1 km || 
|-id=376 bgcolor=#E9E9E9
| 440376 ||  || — || February 2, 2005 || Socorro || LINEAR || — || align=right | 1.9 km || 
|-id=377 bgcolor=#E9E9E9
| 440377 ||  || — || December 18, 2004 || Mount Lemmon || Mount Lemmon Survey || — || align=right | 1.5 km || 
|-id=378 bgcolor=#E9E9E9
| 440378 ||  || — || February 2, 2005 || Kitt Peak || Spacewatch || — || align=right | 1.3 km || 
|-id=379 bgcolor=#E9E9E9
| 440379 ||  || — || December 20, 2004 || Mount Lemmon || Mount Lemmon Survey || MAR || align=right | 1.1 km || 
|-id=380 bgcolor=#E9E9E9
| 440380 ||  || — || February 3, 2005 || Calvin-Rehoboth || Calvin–Rehoboth Obs. || — || align=right | 1.7 km || 
|-id=381 bgcolor=#E9E9E9
| 440381 ||  || — || March 8, 2005 || Kitt Peak || Spacewatch || — || align=right | 1.4 km || 
|-id=382 bgcolor=#E9E9E9
| 440382 ||  || — || February 1, 2005 || Kitt Peak || Spacewatch || — || align=right | 1.0 km || 
|-id=383 bgcolor=#E9E9E9
| 440383 ||  || — || March 8, 2005 || Mount Lemmon || Mount Lemmon Survey || — || align=right | 2.4 km || 
|-id=384 bgcolor=#E9E9E9
| 440384 ||  || — || March 11, 2005 || Kitt Peak || Spacewatch || — || align=right | 2.5 km || 
|-id=385 bgcolor=#E9E9E9
| 440385 ||  || — || March 11, 2005 || Kitt Peak || Spacewatch || ADE || align=right | 2.3 km || 
|-id=386 bgcolor=#E9E9E9
| 440386 ||  || — || March 3, 2005 || Catalina || CSS || — || align=right | 2.3 km || 
|-id=387 bgcolor=#fefefe
| 440387 ||  || — || April 2, 2005 || Mount Lemmon || Mount Lemmon Survey || — || align=right data-sort-value="0.58" | 580 m || 
|-id=388 bgcolor=#E9E9E9
| 440388 ||  || — || April 6, 2005 || Mount Lemmon || Mount Lemmon Survey || — || align=right | 1.9 km || 
|-id=389 bgcolor=#E9E9E9
| 440389 ||  || — || April 2, 2005 || Catalina || CSS || — || align=right | 2.1 km || 
|-id=390 bgcolor=#d6d6d6
| 440390 ||  || — || April 14, 2005 || Kitt Peak || Spacewatch || — || align=right | 3.0 km || 
|-id=391 bgcolor=#E9E9E9
| 440391 ||  || — || April 10, 2005 || Kitt Peak || M. W. Buie || — || align=right | 1.1 km || 
|-id=392 bgcolor=#E9E9E9
| 440392 ||  || — || March 16, 2005 || Mount Lemmon || Mount Lemmon Survey || — || align=right | 1.7 km || 
|-id=393 bgcolor=#E9E9E9
| 440393 ||  || — || May 4, 2005 || Catalina || CSS || — || align=right | 2.0 km || 
|-id=394 bgcolor=#E9E9E9
| 440394 ||  || — || May 4, 2005 || Mount Lemmon || Mount Lemmon Survey || — || align=right | 1.8 km || 
|-id=395 bgcolor=#E9E9E9
| 440395 ||  || — || May 10, 2005 || Kitt Peak || Spacewatch || — || align=right | 2.0 km || 
|-id=396 bgcolor=#d6d6d6
| 440396 ||  || — || May 4, 2005 || Mount Lemmon || Mount Lemmon Survey || — || align=right | 3.0 km || 
|-id=397 bgcolor=#E9E9E9
| 440397 ||  || — || June 4, 2005 || Kitt Peak || Spacewatch || — || align=right | 2.0 km || 
|-id=398 bgcolor=#fefefe
| 440398 ||  || — || June 28, 2005 || Palomar || NEAT || — || align=right data-sort-value="0.75" | 750 m || 
|-id=399 bgcolor=#d6d6d6
| 440399 ||  || — || July 2, 2005 || Kitt Peak || Spacewatch || — || align=right | 2.4 km || 
|-id=400 bgcolor=#fefefe
| 440400 ||  || — || June 13, 2005 || Mount Lemmon || Mount Lemmon Survey || — || align=right data-sort-value="0.63" | 630 m || 
|}

440401–440500 

|-bgcolor=#fefefe
| 440401 ||  || — || July 5, 2005 || Palomar || NEAT || — || align=right data-sort-value="0.72" | 720 m || 
|-id=402 bgcolor=#fefefe
| 440402 ||  || — || July 4, 2005 || Mount Lemmon || Mount Lemmon Survey || — || align=right data-sort-value="0.60" | 600 m || 
|-id=403 bgcolor=#fefefe
| 440403 ||  || — || July 4, 2005 || Kitt Peak || Spacewatch || — || align=right data-sort-value="0.57" | 570 m || 
|-id=404 bgcolor=#fefefe
| 440404 ||  || — || July 1, 2005 || Kitt Peak || Spacewatch || — || align=right data-sort-value="0.52" | 520 m || 
|-id=405 bgcolor=#d6d6d6
| 440405 ||  || — || July 3, 2005 || Mount Lemmon || Mount Lemmon Survey || — || align=right | 2.5 km || 
|-id=406 bgcolor=#d6d6d6
| 440406 ||  || — || July 19, 2005 || Palomar || NEAT || — || align=right | 2.5 km || 
|-id=407 bgcolor=#fefefe
| 440407 ||  || — || July 29, 2005 || Palomar || NEAT || — || align=right data-sort-value="0.79" | 790 m || 
|-id=408 bgcolor=#d6d6d6
| 440408 ||  || — || August 6, 2005 || Arguines || Pla D'Arguines Obs. || — || align=right | 2.5 km || 
|-id=409 bgcolor=#fefefe
| 440409 ||  || — || August 25, 2005 || Palomar || NEAT || H || align=right data-sort-value="0.77" | 770 m || 
|-id=410 bgcolor=#fefefe
| 440410 ||  || — || August 27, 2005 || Kitt Peak || Spacewatch || — || align=right data-sort-value="0.71" | 710 m || 
|-id=411 bgcolor=#d6d6d6
| 440411 Piovani ||  ||  || August 26, 2005 || Vallemare di Borbona || V. S. Casulli || — || align=right | 2.8 km || 
|-id=412 bgcolor=#d6d6d6
| 440412 ||  || — || August 24, 2005 || Palomar || NEAT || — || align=right | 2.2 km || 
|-id=413 bgcolor=#d6d6d6
| 440413 ||  || — || August 25, 2005 || Palomar || NEAT || — || align=right | 2.8 km || 
|-id=414 bgcolor=#d6d6d6
| 440414 ||  || — || August 26, 2005 || Palomar || NEAT || — || align=right | 2.3 km || 
|-id=415 bgcolor=#d6d6d6
| 440415 ||  || — || August 28, 2005 || Siding Spring || SSS || — || align=right | 3.5 km || 
|-id=416 bgcolor=#fefefe
| 440416 ||  || — || June 17, 2005 || Mount Lemmon || Mount Lemmon Survey || — || align=right data-sort-value="0.82" | 820 m || 
|-id=417 bgcolor=#fefefe
| 440417 ||  || — || August 28, 2005 || Anderson Mesa || LONEOS || — || align=right data-sort-value="0.94" | 940 m || 
|-id=418 bgcolor=#fefefe
| 440418 ||  || — || August 29, 2005 || Kitt Peak || Spacewatch || — || align=right data-sort-value="0.68" | 680 m || 
|-id=419 bgcolor=#fefefe
| 440419 ||  || — || August 27, 2005 || Palomar || NEAT || — || align=right data-sort-value="0.77" | 770 m || 
|-id=420 bgcolor=#d6d6d6
| 440420 ||  || — || August 28, 2005 || Kitt Peak || Spacewatch || — || align=right | 2.5 km || 
|-id=421 bgcolor=#fefefe
| 440421 ||  || — || August 29, 2005 || Palomar || NEAT || — || align=right data-sort-value="0.96" | 960 m || 
|-id=422 bgcolor=#fefefe
| 440422 ||  || — || August 29, 2005 || Kitt Peak || Spacewatch || — || align=right data-sort-value="0.67" | 670 m || 
|-id=423 bgcolor=#d6d6d6
| 440423 ||  || — || September 1, 2005 || Kitt Peak || Spacewatch || — || align=right | 2.5 km || 
|-id=424 bgcolor=#fefefe
| 440424 ||  || — || August 31, 2005 || Socorro || LINEAR || — || align=right data-sort-value="0.89" | 890 m || 
|-id=425 bgcolor=#fefefe
| 440425 ||  || — || September 14, 2005 || Kitt Peak || Spacewatch || — || align=right data-sort-value="0.89" | 890 m || 
|-id=426 bgcolor=#d6d6d6
| 440426 ||  || — || September 8, 2005 || Bergisch Gladbach || W. Bickel || — || align=right | 1.8 km || 
|-id=427 bgcolor=#d6d6d6
| 440427 ||  || — || September 14, 2005 || Apache Point || A. C. Becker || EOS || align=right | 1.6 km || 
|-id=428 bgcolor=#d6d6d6
| 440428 ||  || — || September 1, 2005 || Kitt Peak || Spacewatch || — || align=right | 2.7 km || 
|-id=429 bgcolor=#d6d6d6
| 440429 ||  || — || September 25, 2005 || Kitt Peak || Spacewatch || — || align=right | 2.0 km || 
|-id=430 bgcolor=#fefefe
| 440430 ||  || — || September 25, 2005 || Kitt Peak || Spacewatch || (2076) || align=right data-sort-value="0.82" | 820 m || 
|-id=431 bgcolor=#d6d6d6
| 440431 ||  || — || September 26, 2005 || Kitt Peak || Spacewatch || — || align=right | 2.4 km || 
|-id=432 bgcolor=#d6d6d6
| 440432 ||  || — || September 27, 2005 || Socorro || LINEAR || — || align=right | 3.6 km || 
|-id=433 bgcolor=#fefefe
| 440433 ||  || — || September 23, 2005 || Kitt Peak || Spacewatch || — || align=right data-sort-value="0.71" | 710 m || 
|-id=434 bgcolor=#d6d6d6
| 440434 ||  || — || September 23, 2005 || Kitt Peak || Spacewatch || — || align=right | 2.7 km || 
|-id=435 bgcolor=#fefefe
| 440435 ||  || — || September 23, 2005 || Kitt Peak || Spacewatch || — || align=right data-sort-value="0.78" | 780 m || 
|-id=436 bgcolor=#fefefe
| 440436 ||  || — || September 23, 2005 || Kitt Peak || Spacewatch || — || align=right data-sort-value="0.75" | 750 m || 
|-id=437 bgcolor=#d6d6d6
| 440437 ||  || — || September 23, 2005 || Kitt Peak || Spacewatch || — || align=right | 1.9 km || 
|-id=438 bgcolor=#d6d6d6
| 440438 ||  || — || September 24, 2005 || Kitt Peak || Spacewatch || EOS || align=right | 1.6 km || 
|-id=439 bgcolor=#d6d6d6
| 440439 ||  || — || September 24, 2005 || Kitt Peak || Spacewatch || — || align=right | 2.9 km || 
|-id=440 bgcolor=#fefefe
| 440440 ||  || — || September 24, 2005 || Kitt Peak || Spacewatch || — || align=right data-sort-value="0.86" | 860 m || 
|-id=441 bgcolor=#fefefe
| 440441 ||  || — || September 24, 2005 || Kitt Peak || Spacewatch || — || align=right data-sort-value="0.69" | 690 m || 
|-id=442 bgcolor=#d6d6d6
| 440442 ||  || — || September 24, 2005 || Kitt Peak || Spacewatch || EOS || align=right | 1.8 km || 
|-id=443 bgcolor=#d6d6d6
| 440443 ||  || — || September 24, 2005 || Kitt Peak || Spacewatch || EOS || align=right | 1.9 km || 
|-id=444 bgcolor=#d6d6d6
| 440444 ||  || — || September 24, 2005 || Kitt Peak || Spacewatch || — || align=right | 1.7 km || 
|-id=445 bgcolor=#d6d6d6
| 440445 ||  || — || September 26, 2005 || Kitt Peak || Spacewatch || — || align=right | 2.2 km || 
|-id=446 bgcolor=#d6d6d6
| 440446 ||  || — || September 24, 2005 || Kitt Peak || Spacewatch || — || align=right | 2.3 km || 
|-id=447 bgcolor=#fefefe
| 440447 ||  || — || September 24, 2005 || Kitt Peak || Spacewatch || — || align=right data-sort-value="0.68" | 680 m || 
|-id=448 bgcolor=#fefefe
| 440448 ||  || — || September 24, 2005 || Kitt Peak || Spacewatch || — || align=right data-sort-value="0.78" | 780 m || 
|-id=449 bgcolor=#d6d6d6
| 440449 ||  || — || September 24, 2005 || Kitt Peak || Spacewatch || — || align=right | 1.9 km || 
|-id=450 bgcolor=#d6d6d6
| 440450 ||  || — || September 24, 2005 || Kitt Peak || Spacewatch || EOS || align=right | 1.8 km || 
|-id=451 bgcolor=#d6d6d6
| 440451 ||  || — || September 24, 2005 || Kitt Peak || Spacewatch || EOS || align=right | 2.1 km || 
|-id=452 bgcolor=#fefefe
| 440452 ||  || — || September 24, 2005 || Kitt Peak || Spacewatch || — || align=right data-sort-value="0.65" | 650 m || 
|-id=453 bgcolor=#d6d6d6
| 440453 ||  || — || September 25, 2005 || Palomar || NEAT || EOS || align=right | 2.1 km || 
|-id=454 bgcolor=#fefefe
| 440454 ||  || — || September 24, 2005 || Kitt Peak || Spacewatch || — || align=right data-sort-value="0.90" | 900 m || 
|-id=455 bgcolor=#d6d6d6
| 440455 ||  || — || September 29, 2005 || Kitt Peak || Spacewatch || — || align=right | 2.7 km || 
|-id=456 bgcolor=#d6d6d6
| 440456 ||  || — || September 25, 2005 || Kitt Peak || Spacewatch || — || align=right | 2.6 km || 
|-id=457 bgcolor=#d6d6d6
| 440457 ||  || — || September 25, 2005 || Kitt Peak || Spacewatch || — || align=right | 2.4 km || 
|-id=458 bgcolor=#d6d6d6
| 440458 ||  || — || September 26, 2005 || Kitt Peak || Spacewatch || — || align=right | 3.0 km || 
|-id=459 bgcolor=#d6d6d6
| 440459 ||  || — || September 27, 2005 || Kitt Peak || Spacewatch || — || align=right | 3.1 km || 
|-id=460 bgcolor=#d6d6d6
| 440460 ||  || — || September 29, 2005 || Kitt Peak || Spacewatch || EOS || align=right | 1.8 km || 
|-id=461 bgcolor=#fefefe
| 440461 ||  || — || September 29, 2005 || Kitt Peak || Spacewatch || — || align=right data-sort-value="0.71" | 710 m || 
|-id=462 bgcolor=#fefefe
| 440462 ||  || — || September 29, 2005 || Kitt Peak || Spacewatch || — || align=right data-sort-value="0.65" | 650 m || 
|-id=463 bgcolor=#fefefe
| 440463 ||  || — || September 29, 2005 || Kitt Peak || Spacewatch || BAP || align=right data-sort-value="0.76" | 760 m || 
|-id=464 bgcolor=#d6d6d6
| 440464 ||  || — || September 30, 2005 || Mount Lemmon || Mount Lemmon Survey || EOS || align=right | 2.0 km || 
|-id=465 bgcolor=#fefefe
| 440465 ||  || — || September 30, 2005 || Kitt Peak || Spacewatch || — || align=right data-sort-value="0.60" | 600 m || 
|-id=466 bgcolor=#d6d6d6
| 440466 ||  || — || September 30, 2005 || Kitt Peak || Spacewatch || — || align=right | 2.7 km || 
|-id=467 bgcolor=#d6d6d6
| 440467 ||  || — || September 30, 2005 || Catalina || CSS || — || align=right | 2.9 km || 
|-id=468 bgcolor=#d6d6d6
| 440468 ||  || — || September 30, 2005 || Kitt Peak || Spacewatch || — || align=right | 3.0 km || 
|-id=469 bgcolor=#fefefe
| 440469 ||  || — || September 30, 2005 || Kitt Peak || Spacewatch || — || align=right data-sort-value="0.87" | 870 m || 
|-id=470 bgcolor=#d6d6d6
| 440470 ||  || — || September 30, 2005 || Kitt Peak || Spacewatch || — || align=right | 2.7 km || 
|-id=471 bgcolor=#fefefe
| 440471 ||  || — || September 30, 2005 || Mount Lemmon || Mount Lemmon Survey || — || align=right data-sort-value="0.64" | 640 m || 
|-id=472 bgcolor=#d6d6d6
| 440472 ||  || — || September 22, 2005 || Palomar || NEAT || — || align=right | 2.2 km || 
|-id=473 bgcolor=#fefefe
| 440473 ||  || — || September 23, 2005 || Kitt Peak || Spacewatch || — || align=right data-sort-value="0.71" | 710 m || 
|-id=474 bgcolor=#fefefe
| 440474 ||  || — || September 23, 2005 || Kitt Peak || Spacewatch || — || align=right data-sort-value="0.82" | 820 m || 
|-id=475 bgcolor=#d6d6d6
| 440475 ||  || — || September 25, 2005 || Kitt Peak || Spacewatch || — || align=right | 2.0 km || 
|-id=476 bgcolor=#d6d6d6
| 440476 ||  || — || September 30, 2005 || Anderson Mesa || LONEOS || — || align=right | 3.9 km || 
|-id=477 bgcolor=#d6d6d6
| 440477 ||  || — || September 27, 2005 || Apache Point || A. C. Becker || — || align=right | 2.8 km || 
|-id=478 bgcolor=#d6d6d6
| 440478 ||  || — || September 27, 2005 || Apache Point || A. C. Becker || — || align=right | 2.9 km || 
|-id=479 bgcolor=#FA8072
| 440479 ||  || — || October 1, 2005 || Catalina || CSS || H || align=right data-sort-value="0.67" | 670 m || 
|-id=480 bgcolor=#d6d6d6
| 440480 ||  || — || October 1, 2005 || Goodricke-Pigott || R. A. Tucker || — || align=right | 2.2 km || 
|-id=481 bgcolor=#fefefe
| 440481 ||  || — || September 14, 2005 || Kitt Peak || Spacewatch || — || align=right data-sort-value="0.67" | 670 m || 
|-id=482 bgcolor=#fefefe
| 440482 ||  || — || October 1, 2005 || Socorro || LINEAR || — || align=right data-sort-value="0.74" | 740 m || 
|-id=483 bgcolor=#fefefe
| 440483 ||  || — || September 24, 2005 || Kitt Peak || Spacewatch || — || align=right data-sort-value="0.94" | 940 m || 
|-id=484 bgcolor=#d6d6d6
| 440484 ||  || — || October 5, 2005 || Kitt Peak || Spacewatch || — || align=right | 2.1 km || 
|-id=485 bgcolor=#fefefe
| 440485 ||  || — || October 5, 2005 || Kitt Peak || Spacewatch || — || align=right data-sort-value="0.78" | 780 m || 
|-id=486 bgcolor=#fefefe
| 440486 ||  || — || September 30, 2005 || Catalina || CSS || — || align=right data-sort-value="0.75" | 750 m || 
|-id=487 bgcolor=#d6d6d6
| 440487 ||  || — || October 3, 2005 || Kitt Peak || Spacewatch || EOS || align=right | 1.4 km || 
|-id=488 bgcolor=#fefefe
| 440488 ||  || — || October 3, 2005 || Kitt Peak || Spacewatch || — || align=right data-sort-value="0.65" | 650 m || 
|-id=489 bgcolor=#d6d6d6
| 440489 ||  || — || October 3, 2005 || Kitt Peak || Spacewatch || — || align=right | 2.0 km || 
|-id=490 bgcolor=#fefefe
| 440490 ||  || — || October 1, 2005 || Catalina || CSS || — || align=right data-sort-value="0.82" | 820 m || 
|-id=491 bgcolor=#d6d6d6
| 440491 ||  || — || October 7, 2005 || Mount Lemmon || Mount Lemmon Survey || — || align=right | 1.9 km || 
|-id=492 bgcolor=#d6d6d6
| 440492 ||  || — || October 9, 2005 || Kitt Peak || Spacewatch || — || align=right | 2.5 km || 
|-id=493 bgcolor=#fefefe
| 440493 ||  || — || September 29, 2005 || Kitt Peak || Spacewatch || — || align=right data-sort-value="0.76" | 760 m || 
|-id=494 bgcolor=#d6d6d6
| 440494 ||  || — || October 7, 2005 || Kitt Peak || Spacewatch || EOS || align=right | 1.5 km || 
|-id=495 bgcolor=#d6d6d6
| 440495 ||  || — || September 27, 2005 || Kitt Peak || Spacewatch || VER || align=right | 2.1 km || 
|-id=496 bgcolor=#d6d6d6
| 440496 ||  || — || October 10, 2005 || Catalina || CSS || — || align=right | 2.6 km || 
|-id=497 bgcolor=#fefefe
| 440497 ||  || — || October 8, 2005 || Kitt Peak || Spacewatch || — || align=right data-sort-value="0.59" | 590 m || 
|-id=498 bgcolor=#fefefe
| 440498 ||  || — || September 23, 2005 || Kitt Peak || Spacewatch || — || align=right data-sort-value="0.78" | 780 m || 
|-id=499 bgcolor=#d6d6d6
| 440499 ||  || — || October 8, 2005 || Kitt Peak || Spacewatch || — || align=right | 2.4 km || 
|-id=500 bgcolor=#d6d6d6
| 440500 ||  || — || October 9, 2005 || Kitt Peak || Spacewatch || — || align=right | 2.8 km || 
|}

440501–440600 

|-bgcolor=#fefefe
| 440501 ||  || — || September 29, 2005 || Kitt Peak || Spacewatch || — || align=right data-sort-value="0.83" | 830 m || 
|-id=502 bgcolor=#d6d6d6
| 440502 ||  || — || October 6, 2005 || Kitt Peak || Spacewatch || THM || align=right | 2.4 km || 
|-id=503 bgcolor=#d6d6d6
| 440503 ||  || — || October 1, 2005 || Mount Lemmon || Mount Lemmon Survey || EOS || align=right | 1.7 km || 
|-id=504 bgcolor=#d6d6d6
| 440504 ||  || — || October 1, 2005 || Mount Lemmon || Mount Lemmon Survey || HYG || align=right | 2.4 km || 
|-id=505 bgcolor=#d6d6d6
| 440505 ||  || — || October 1, 2005 || Kitt Peak || Spacewatch || — || align=right | 1.9 km || 
|-id=506 bgcolor=#d6d6d6
| 440506 ||  || — || October 7, 2005 || Kitt Peak || Spacewatch || — || align=right | 2.1 km || 
|-id=507 bgcolor=#d6d6d6
| 440507 ||  || — || October 23, 2005 || Kitt Peak || Spacewatch || — || align=right | 2.5 km || 
|-id=508 bgcolor=#d6d6d6
| 440508 ||  || — || October 23, 2005 || Kitt Peak || Spacewatch || — || align=right | 2.5 km || 
|-id=509 bgcolor=#d6d6d6
| 440509 ||  || — || October 24, 2005 || Kitt Peak || Spacewatch || — || align=right | 2.1 km || 
|-id=510 bgcolor=#d6d6d6
| 440510 ||  || — || October 24, 2005 || Kitt Peak || Spacewatch || — || align=right | 2.9 km || 
|-id=511 bgcolor=#d6d6d6
| 440511 ||  || — || October 24, 2005 || Kitt Peak || Spacewatch || — || align=right | 1.7 km || 
|-id=512 bgcolor=#fefefe
| 440512 ||  || — || October 24, 2005 || Kitt Peak || Spacewatch || — || align=right data-sort-value="0.73" | 730 m || 
|-id=513 bgcolor=#d6d6d6
| 440513 ||  || — || October 24, 2005 || Kitt Peak || Spacewatch || THM || align=right | 2.0 km || 
|-id=514 bgcolor=#d6d6d6
| 440514 ||  || — || October 24, 2005 || Kitt Peak || Spacewatch || THM || align=right | 2.0 km || 
|-id=515 bgcolor=#fefefe
| 440515 ||  || — || October 5, 2005 || Kitt Peak || Spacewatch || — || align=right data-sort-value="0.50" | 500 m || 
|-id=516 bgcolor=#fefefe
| 440516 ||  || — || October 24, 2005 || Anderson Mesa || LONEOS || (2076) || align=right data-sort-value="0.86" | 860 m || 
|-id=517 bgcolor=#d6d6d6
| 440517 ||  || — || October 25, 2005 || Mount Lemmon || Mount Lemmon Survey || — || align=right | 2.5 km || 
|-id=518 bgcolor=#d6d6d6
| 440518 ||  || — || October 23, 2005 || Catalina || CSS || EOS || align=right | 2.4 km || 
|-id=519 bgcolor=#d6d6d6
| 440519 ||  || — || October 23, 2005 || Palomar || NEAT || — || align=right | 2.2 km || 
|-id=520 bgcolor=#fefefe
| 440520 ||  || — || October 22, 2005 || Kitt Peak || Spacewatch || — || align=right data-sort-value="0.55" | 550 m || 
|-id=521 bgcolor=#d6d6d6
| 440521 ||  || — || October 22, 2005 || Kitt Peak || Spacewatch || EOS || align=right | 1.6 km || 
|-id=522 bgcolor=#d6d6d6
| 440522 ||  || — || October 22, 2005 || Kitt Peak || Spacewatch || EOS || align=right | 1.5 km || 
|-id=523 bgcolor=#fefefe
| 440523 ||  || — || October 22, 2005 || Kitt Peak || Spacewatch || — || align=right data-sort-value="0.83" | 830 m || 
|-id=524 bgcolor=#d6d6d6
| 440524 ||  || — || October 22, 2005 || Kitt Peak || Spacewatch || — || align=right | 2.3 km || 
|-id=525 bgcolor=#fefefe
| 440525 ||  || — || October 22, 2005 || Kitt Peak || Spacewatch || — || align=right data-sort-value="0.90" | 900 m || 
|-id=526 bgcolor=#d6d6d6
| 440526 ||  || — || October 22, 2005 || Kitt Peak || Spacewatch || — || align=right | 3.7 km || 
|-id=527 bgcolor=#d6d6d6
| 440527 ||  || — || October 22, 2005 || Kitt Peak || Spacewatch || THM || align=right | 2.1 km || 
|-id=528 bgcolor=#d6d6d6
| 440528 ||  || — || October 22, 2005 || Kitt Peak || Spacewatch || EOS || align=right | 1.9 km || 
|-id=529 bgcolor=#d6d6d6
| 440529 ||  || — || October 22, 2005 || Kitt Peak || Spacewatch || — || align=right | 2.9 km || 
|-id=530 bgcolor=#fefefe
| 440530 ||  || — || October 22, 2005 || Kitt Peak || Spacewatch || NYS || align=right data-sort-value="0.65" | 650 m || 
|-id=531 bgcolor=#fefefe
| 440531 ||  || — || October 22, 2005 || Kitt Peak || Spacewatch || — || align=right data-sort-value="0.67" | 670 m || 
|-id=532 bgcolor=#fefefe
| 440532 ||  || — || October 12, 2005 || Kitt Peak || Spacewatch || — || align=right data-sort-value="0.65" | 650 m || 
|-id=533 bgcolor=#d6d6d6
| 440533 ||  || — || October 24, 2005 || Kitt Peak || Spacewatch || THM || align=right | 2.0 km || 
|-id=534 bgcolor=#d6d6d6
| 440534 ||  || — || October 25, 2005 || Mount Lemmon || Mount Lemmon Survey || — || align=right | 2.7 km || 
|-id=535 bgcolor=#d6d6d6
| 440535 ||  || — || October 26, 2005 || Kitt Peak || Spacewatch || — || align=right | 2.7 km || 
|-id=536 bgcolor=#fefefe
| 440536 ||  || — || October 26, 2005 || Kitt Peak || Spacewatch || — || align=right data-sort-value="0.90" | 900 m || 
|-id=537 bgcolor=#fefefe
| 440537 ||  || — || October 10, 2005 || Catalina || CSS || H || align=right data-sort-value="0.79" | 790 m || 
|-id=538 bgcolor=#d6d6d6
| 440538 ||  || — || October 24, 2005 || Kitt Peak || Spacewatch || — || align=right | 1.9 km || 
|-id=539 bgcolor=#d6d6d6
| 440539 ||  || — || October 24, 2005 || Kitt Peak || Spacewatch || — || align=right | 2.2 km || 
|-id=540 bgcolor=#d6d6d6
| 440540 ||  || — || October 1, 2005 || Mount Lemmon || Mount Lemmon Survey || — || align=right | 3.3 km || 
|-id=541 bgcolor=#d6d6d6
| 440541 ||  || — || October 25, 2005 || Mount Lemmon || Mount Lemmon Survey || — || align=right | 2.9 km || 
|-id=542 bgcolor=#d6d6d6
| 440542 ||  || — || September 29, 2005 || Mount Lemmon || Mount Lemmon Survey || — || align=right | 2.1 km || 
|-id=543 bgcolor=#d6d6d6
| 440543 ||  || — || October 24, 2005 || Kitt Peak || Spacewatch || THM || align=right | 2.2 km || 
|-id=544 bgcolor=#d6d6d6
| 440544 ||  || — || October 25, 2005 || Kitt Peak || Spacewatch || — || align=right | 2.7 km || 
|-id=545 bgcolor=#d6d6d6
| 440545 ||  || — || October 25, 2005 || Kitt Peak || Spacewatch || — || align=right | 2.4 km || 
|-id=546 bgcolor=#d6d6d6
| 440546 ||  || — || October 25, 2005 || Kitt Peak || Spacewatch || — || align=right | 2.5 km || 
|-id=547 bgcolor=#d6d6d6
| 440547 ||  || — || October 25, 2005 || Kitt Peak || Spacewatch || — || align=right | 2.3 km || 
|-id=548 bgcolor=#fefefe
| 440548 ||  || — || October 25, 2005 || Kitt Peak || Spacewatch || V || align=right data-sort-value="0.64" | 640 m || 
|-id=549 bgcolor=#d6d6d6
| 440549 ||  || — || October 25, 2005 || Kitt Peak || Spacewatch || EOS || align=right | 1.5 km || 
|-id=550 bgcolor=#d6d6d6
| 440550 ||  || — || October 28, 2005 || Catalina || CSS || — || align=right | 2.9 km || 
|-id=551 bgcolor=#d6d6d6
| 440551 ||  || — || October 22, 2005 || Kitt Peak || Spacewatch || — || align=right | 2.6 km || 
|-id=552 bgcolor=#d6d6d6
| 440552 ||  || — || October 25, 2005 || Mount Lemmon || Mount Lemmon Survey || — || align=right | 2.3 km || 
|-id=553 bgcolor=#d6d6d6
| 440553 ||  || — || October 25, 2005 || Mount Lemmon || Mount Lemmon Survey || — || align=right | 2.9 km || 
|-id=554 bgcolor=#d6d6d6
| 440554 ||  || — || October 27, 2005 || Kitt Peak || Spacewatch || — || align=right | 2.1 km || 
|-id=555 bgcolor=#d6d6d6
| 440555 ||  || — || October 27, 2005 || Mount Lemmon || Mount Lemmon Survey || THM || align=right | 2.3 km || 
|-id=556 bgcolor=#d6d6d6
| 440556 ||  || — || October 27, 2005 || Kitt Peak || Spacewatch || — || align=right | 2.0 km || 
|-id=557 bgcolor=#fefefe
| 440557 ||  || — || October 24, 2005 || Kitt Peak || Spacewatch || — || align=right data-sort-value="0.65" | 650 m || 
|-id=558 bgcolor=#d6d6d6
| 440558 ||  || — || October 26, 2005 || Kitt Peak || Spacewatch || THM || align=right | 2.0 km || 
|-id=559 bgcolor=#d6d6d6
| 440559 ||  || — || October 26, 2005 || Kitt Peak || Spacewatch || — || align=right | 2.7 km || 
|-id=560 bgcolor=#d6d6d6
| 440560 ||  || — || October 29, 2005 || Mount Lemmon || Mount Lemmon Survey || THM || align=right | 1.8 km || 
|-id=561 bgcolor=#fefefe
| 440561 ||  || — || October 29, 2005 || Kitt Peak || Spacewatch || NYS || align=right data-sort-value="0.58" | 580 m || 
|-id=562 bgcolor=#d6d6d6
| 440562 ||  || — || November 18, 2000 || Kitt Peak || Spacewatch || — || align=right | 2.1 km || 
|-id=563 bgcolor=#fefefe
| 440563 ||  || — || October 29, 2005 || Kitt Peak || Spacewatch || critical || align=right data-sort-value="0.65" | 650 m || 
|-id=564 bgcolor=#d6d6d6
| 440564 ||  || — || October 28, 2005 || Kitt Peak || Spacewatch || THM || align=right | 1.7 km || 
|-id=565 bgcolor=#d6d6d6
| 440565 ||  || — || October 29, 2005 || Kitt Peak || Spacewatch || EOS || align=right | 1.9 km || 
|-id=566 bgcolor=#d6d6d6
| 440566 ||  || — || October 29, 2005 || Catalina || CSS || — || align=right | 2.5 km || 
|-id=567 bgcolor=#fefefe
| 440567 ||  || — || October 29, 2005 || Catalina || CSS || — || align=right data-sort-value="0.95" | 950 m || 
|-id=568 bgcolor=#d6d6d6
| 440568 ||  || — || October 27, 2005 || Kitt Peak || Spacewatch || — || align=right | 2.5 km || 
|-id=569 bgcolor=#fefefe
| 440569 ||  || — || October 27, 2005 || Anderson Mesa || LONEOS || — || align=right data-sort-value="0.80" | 800 m || 
|-id=570 bgcolor=#d6d6d6
| 440570 ||  || — || October 27, 2005 || Kitt Peak || Spacewatch || — || align=right | 2.8 km || 
|-id=571 bgcolor=#fefefe
| 440571 ||  || — || October 30, 2005 || Catalina || CSS || — || align=right data-sort-value="0.68" | 680 m || 
|-id=572 bgcolor=#d6d6d6
| 440572 ||  || — || October 29, 2005 || Mount Lemmon || Mount Lemmon Survey || THM || align=right | 2.0 km || 
|-id=573 bgcolor=#fefefe
| 440573 ||  || — || October 1, 2005 || Kitt Peak || Spacewatch || — || align=right data-sort-value="0.57" | 570 m || 
|-id=574 bgcolor=#d6d6d6
| 440574 ||  || — || October 27, 2005 || Mount Lemmon || Mount Lemmon Survey || — || align=right | 2.7 km || 
|-id=575 bgcolor=#d6d6d6
| 440575 ||  || — || October 28, 2005 || Kitt Peak || Spacewatch || — || align=right | 1.9 km || 
|-id=576 bgcolor=#fefefe
| 440576 ||  || — || October 13, 1998 || Kitt Peak || Spacewatch || — || align=right data-sort-value="0.82" | 820 m || 
|-id=577 bgcolor=#d6d6d6
| 440577 ||  || — || October 29, 2005 || Catalina || CSS || EOS || align=right | 2.4 km || 
|-id=578 bgcolor=#fefefe
| 440578 ||  || — || October 30, 2005 || Kitt Peak || Spacewatch || V || align=right data-sort-value="0.65" | 650 m || 
|-id=579 bgcolor=#d6d6d6
| 440579 ||  || — || October 30, 2005 || Kitt Peak || Spacewatch || — || align=right | 2.2 km || 
|-id=580 bgcolor=#fefefe
| 440580 ||  || — || October 30, 2005 || Mount Lemmon || Mount Lemmon Survey || — || align=right data-sort-value="0.78" | 780 m || 
|-id=581 bgcolor=#d6d6d6
| 440581 ||  || — || October 26, 2005 || Anderson Mesa || LONEOS || — || align=right | 3.6 km || 
|-id=582 bgcolor=#d6d6d6
| 440582 ||  || — || October 22, 2005 || Catalina || CSS || — || align=right | 2.7 km || 
|-id=583 bgcolor=#d6d6d6
| 440583 ||  || — || October 10, 2005 || Catalina || CSS || — || align=right | 2.5 km || 
|-id=584 bgcolor=#d6d6d6
| 440584 ||  || — || October 27, 2005 || Catalina || CSS || — || align=right | 3.1 km || 
|-id=585 bgcolor=#d6d6d6
| 440585 ||  || — || October 31, 2005 || Anderson Mesa || LONEOS || — || align=right | 2.8 km || 
|-id=586 bgcolor=#fefefe
| 440586 ||  || — || October 27, 2005 || Anderson Mesa || LONEOS || — || align=right data-sort-value="0.85" | 850 m || 
|-id=587 bgcolor=#d6d6d6
| 440587 ||  || — || October 25, 2005 || Mount Lemmon || Mount Lemmon Survey || — || align=right | 2.5 km || 
|-id=588 bgcolor=#d6d6d6
| 440588 ||  || — || October 28, 2005 || Mount Lemmon || Mount Lemmon Survey || — || align=right | 3.0 km || 
|-id=589 bgcolor=#d6d6d6
| 440589 ||  || — || September 23, 2005 || Kitt Peak || Spacewatch || — || align=right | 2.2 km || 
|-id=590 bgcolor=#d6d6d6
| 440590 ||  || — || October 27, 2005 || Apache Point || A. C. Becker || — || align=right | 3.2 km || 
|-id=591 bgcolor=#d6d6d6
| 440591 ||  || — || October 25, 2005 || Mount Lemmon || Mount Lemmon Survey || — || align=right | 2.5 km || 
|-id=592 bgcolor=#d6d6d6
| 440592 ||  || — || October 31, 2005 || Kitt Peak || Spacewatch || — || align=right | 2.2 km || 
|-id=593 bgcolor=#fefefe
| 440593 ||  || — || October 27, 2005 || Mount Lemmon || Mount Lemmon Survey || — || align=right data-sort-value="0.76" | 760 m || 
|-id=594 bgcolor=#d6d6d6
| 440594 ||  || — || October 24, 2005 || Kitt Peak || Spacewatch || EOS || align=right | 1.9 km || 
|-id=595 bgcolor=#d6d6d6
| 440595 ||  || — || November 1, 2005 || Kitt Peak || Spacewatch || — || align=right | 2.0 km || 
|-id=596 bgcolor=#d6d6d6
| 440596 ||  || — || October 22, 2005 || Kitt Peak || Spacewatch || — || align=right | 2.8 km || 
|-id=597 bgcolor=#fefefe
| 440597 ||  || — || October 25, 2005 || Kitt Peak || Spacewatch || — || align=right data-sort-value="0.77" | 770 m || 
|-id=598 bgcolor=#d6d6d6
| 440598 ||  || — || November 4, 2005 || Kitt Peak || Spacewatch || — || align=right | 2.0 km || 
|-id=599 bgcolor=#d6d6d6
| 440599 ||  || — || October 25, 2005 || Mount Lemmon || Mount Lemmon Survey || — || align=right | 2.4 km || 
|-id=600 bgcolor=#fefefe
| 440600 ||  || — || September 30, 2005 || Mount Lemmon || Mount Lemmon Survey || — || align=right data-sort-value="0.62" | 620 m || 
|}

440601–440700 

|-bgcolor=#fefefe
| 440601 ||  || — || November 4, 2005 || Kitt Peak || Spacewatch || — || align=right data-sort-value="0.76" | 760 m || 
|-id=602 bgcolor=#d6d6d6
| 440602 ||  || — || October 25, 2005 || Kitt Peak || Spacewatch || EOS || align=right | 1.9 km || 
|-id=603 bgcolor=#fefefe
| 440603 ||  || — || October 1, 2005 || Catalina || CSS || — || align=right data-sort-value="0.62" | 620 m || 
|-id=604 bgcolor=#fefefe
| 440604 ||  || — || October 25, 2005 || Kitt Peak || Spacewatch || — || align=right data-sort-value="0.83" | 830 m || 
|-id=605 bgcolor=#d6d6d6
| 440605 ||  || — || October 28, 2005 || Kitt Peak || Spacewatch || — || align=right | 2.5 km || 
|-id=606 bgcolor=#d6d6d6
| 440606 ||  || — || November 1, 2005 || Mount Lemmon || Mount Lemmon Survey || — || align=right | 2.9 km || 
|-id=607 bgcolor=#fefefe
| 440607 ||  || — || October 1, 2005 || Catalina || CSS || — || align=right data-sort-value="0.90" | 900 m || 
|-id=608 bgcolor=#d6d6d6
| 440608 ||  || — || October 25, 2005 || Kitt Peak || Spacewatch || — || align=right | 2.0 km || 
|-id=609 bgcolor=#fefefe
| 440609 ||  || — || November 6, 2005 || Kitt Peak || Spacewatch || — || align=right data-sort-value="0.71" | 710 m || 
|-id=610 bgcolor=#d6d6d6
| 440610 ||  || — || October 25, 2005 || Kitt Peak || Spacewatch || — || align=right | 3.6 km || 
|-id=611 bgcolor=#d6d6d6
| 440611 ||  || — || November 8, 2005 || Socorro || LINEAR || — || align=right | 4.8 km || 
|-id=612 bgcolor=#fefefe
| 440612 ||  || — || October 27, 2005 || Mount Lemmon || Mount Lemmon Survey || — || align=right data-sort-value="0.71" | 710 m || 
|-id=613 bgcolor=#fefefe
| 440613 ||  || — || November 11, 2005 || Kitt Peak || Spacewatch || — || align=right data-sort-value="0.75" | 750 m || 
|-id=614 bgcolor=#d6d6d6
| 440614 ||  || — || November 11, 2005 || Kitt Peak || Spacewatch || THM || align=right | 2.3 km || 
|-id=615 bgcolor=#d6d6d6
| 440615 ||  || — || November 1, 2005 || Catalina || CSS || — || align=right | 3.3 km || 
|-id=616 bgcolor=#fefefe
| 440616 ||  || — || October 8, 2005 || Kitt Peak || Spacewatch || V || align=right data-sort-value="0.52" | 520 m || 
|-id=617 bgcolor=#d6d6d6
| 440617 ||  || — || November 22, 2005 || Socorro || LINEAR || — || align=right | 3.3 km || 
|-id=618 bgcolor=#d6d6d6
| 440618 ||  || — || November 20, 2005 || Palomar || NEAT || — || align=right | 3.2 km || 
|-id=619 bgcolor=#fefefe
| 440619 ||  || — || November 21, 2005 || Junk Bond || D. Healy || — || align=right data-sort-value="0.75" | 750 m || 
|-id=620 bgcolor=#d6d6d6
| 440620 ||  || — || October 31, 2005 || Mount Lemmon || Mount Lemmon Survey || — || align=right | 3.3 km || 
|-id=621 bgcolor=#fefefe
| 440621 ||  || — || November 22, 2005 || Kitt Peak || Spacewatch || — || align=right data-sort-value="0.69" | 690 m || 
|-id=622 bgcolor=#d6d6d6
| 440622 ||  || — || October 30, 2005 || Mount Lemmon || Mount Lemmon Survey || — || align=right | 3.0 km || 
|-id=623 bgcolor=#FA8072
| 440623 ||  || — || October 28, 2005 || Mount Lemmon || Mount Lemmon Survey || — || align=right data-sort-value="0.55" | 550 m || 
|-id=624 bgcolor=#d6d6d6
| 440624 ||  || — || November 21, 2005 || Kitt Peak || Spacewatch || EOS || align=right | 2.2 km || 
|-id=625 bgcolor=#fefefe
| 440625 ||  || — || November 21, 2005 || Kitt Peak || Spacewatch || — || align=right | 1.0 km || 
|-id=626 bgcolor=#fefefe
| 440626 ||  || — || November 22, 2005 || Kitt Peak || Spacewatch || — || align=right data-sort-value="0.68" | 680 m || 
|-id=627 bgcolor=#d6d6d6
| 440627 ||  || — || October 25, 2005 || Mount Lemmon || Mount Lemmon Survey || EOS || align=right | 1.7 km || 
|-id=628 bgcolor=#d6d6d6
| 440628 ||  || — || November 25, 2005 || Kitt Peak || Spacewatch || — || align=right | 3.9 km || 
|-id=629 bgcolor=#fefefe
| 440629 ||  || — || November 25, 2005 || Kitt Peak || Spacewatch || NYS || align=right data-sort-value="0.55" | 550 m || 
|-id=630 bgcolor=#d6d6d6
| 440630 ||  || — || October 25, 2005 || Catalina || CSS || — || align=right | 4.0 km || 
|-id=631 bgcolor=#fefefe
| 440631 ||  || — || October 25, 2005 || Catalina || CSS || — || align=right | 1.3 km || 
|-id=632 bgcolor=#d6d6d6
| 440632 ||  || — || November 26, 2005 || Kitt Peak || Spacewatch || — || align=right | 3.3 km || 
|-id=633 bgcolor=#FA8072
| 440633 ||  || — || November 21, 2005 || Catalina || CSS || — || align=right data-sort-value="0.70" | 700 m || 
|-id=634 bgcolor=#d6d6d6
| 440634 ||  || — || October 25, 2005 || Kitt Peak || Spacewatch || — || align=right | 3.4 km || 
|-id=635 bgcolor=#d6d6d6
| 440635 ||  || — || November 25, 2005 || Kitt Peak || Spacewatch || — || align=right | 4.9 km || 
|-id=636 bgcolor=#fefefe
| 440636 ||  || — || November 1, 2005 || Kitt Peak || Spacewatch || — || align=right data-sort-value="0.68" | 680 m || 
|-id=637 bgcolor=#fefefe
| 440637 ||  || — || October 30, 2005 || Kitt Peak || Spacewatch || — || align=right data-sort-value="0.82" | 820 m || 
|-id=638 bgcolor=#fefefe
| 440638 ||  || — || October 30, 2005 || Mount Lemmon || Mount Lemmon Survey || — || align=right data-sort-value="0.69" | 690 m || 
|-id=639 bgcolor=#d6d6d6
| 440639 ||  || — || November 28, 2005 || Mount Lemmon || Mount Lemmon Survey || — || align=right | 3.9 km || 
|-id=640 bgcolor=#d6d6d6
| 440640 ||  || — || November 28, 2005 || Socorro || LINEAR || — || align=right | 3.1 km || 
|-id=641 bgcolor=#d6d6d6
| 440641 ||  || — || October 28, 2005 || Mount Lemmon || Mount Lemmon Survey || — || align=right | 2.0 km || 
|-id=642 bgcolor=#d6d6d6
| 440642 ||  || — || November 25, 2005 || Catalina || CSS || EOS || align=right | 2.0 km || 
|-id=643 bgcolor=#fefefe
| 440643 ||  || — || October 28, 2005 || Kitt Peak || Spacewatch || — || align=right data-sort-value="0.68" | 680 m || 
|-id=644 bgcolor=#d6d6d6
| 440644 ||  || — || November 30, 2005 || Mount Lemmon || Mount Lemmon Survey || EOS || align=right | 1.9 km || 
|-id=645 bgcolor=#fefefe
| 440645 ||  || — || November 21, 2005 || Catalina || CSS || — || align=right data-sort-value="0.90" | 900 m || 
|-id=646 bgcolor=#d6d6d6
| 440646 ||  || — || November 25, 2005 || Mount Lemmon || Mount Lemmon Survey || THM || align=right | 1.8 km || 
|-id=647 bgcolor=#d6d6d6
| 440647 ||  || — || November 26, 2005 || Kitt Peak || Spacewatch || — || align=right | 3.2 km || 
|-id=648 bgcolor=#fefefe
| 440648 ||  || — || November 29, 2005 || Kitt Peak || Spacewatch || — || align=right data-sort-value="0.69" | 690 m || 
|-id=649 bgcolor=#d6d6d6
| 440649 ||  || — || November 29, 2005 || Mount Lemmon || Mount Lemmon Survey || — || align=right | 1.7 km || 
|-id=650 bgcolor=#d6d6d6
| 440650 ||  || — || November 29, 2005 || Mount Lemmon || Mount Lemmon Survey || — || align=right | 2.5 km || 
|-id=651 bgcolor=#fefefe
| 440651 ||  || — || November 30, 2005 || Kitt Peak || Spacewatch || — || align=right data-sort-value="0.79" | 790 m || 
|-id=652 bgcolor=#d6d6d6
| 440652 ||  || — || November 30, 2005 || Kitt Peak || Spacewatch || Tj (2.96) || align=right | 6.0 km || 
|-id=653 bgcolor=#fefefe
| 440653 ||  || — || November 30, 2005 || Kitt Peak || Spacewatch || — || align=right data-sort-value="0.93" | 930 m || 
|-id=654 bgcolor=#d6d6d6
| 440654 ||  || — || November 28, 2005 || Socorro || LINEAR || — || align=right | 5.2 km || 
|-id=655 bgcolor=#d6d6d6
| 440655 ||  || — || November 21, 2005 || Kitt Peak || Spacewatch || — || align=right | 4.6 km || 
|-id=656 bgcolor=#d6d6d6
| 440656 ||  || — || November 26, 2005 || Kitt Peak || Spacewatch || — || align=right | 3.1 km || 
|-id=657 bgcolor=#d6d6d6
| 440657 ||  || — || October 28, 2005 || Mount Lemmon || Mount Lemmon Survey || — || align=right | 3.1 km || 
|-id=658 bgcolor=#d6d6d6
| 440658 ||  || — || December 1, 2005 || Kitt Peak || Spacewatch || — || align=right | 4.7 km || 
|-id=659 bgcolor=#d6d6d6
| 440659 ||  || — || December 4, 2005 || Kitt Peak || Spacewatch || — || align=right | 2.8 km || 
|-id=660 bgcolor=#fefefe
| 440660 ||  || — || December 1, 2005 || Catalina || CSS || — || align=right data-sort-value="0.82" | 820 m || 
|-id=661 bgcolor=#d6d6d6
| 440661 ||  || — || December 4, 2005 || Kitt Peak || Spacewatch || — || align=right | 2.1 km || 
|-id=662 bgcolor=#fefefe
| 440662 ||  || — || December 4, 2005 || Kitt Peak || Spacewatch || — || align=right data-sort-value="0.71" | 710 m || 
|-id=663 bgcolor=#d6d6d6
| 440663 ||  || — || November 26, 2005 || Mount Lemmon || Mount Lemmon Survey || — || align=right | 2.5 km || 
|-id=664 bgcolor=#fefefe
| 440664 ||  || — || October 25, 2005 || Kitt Peak || Spacewatch || — || align=right data-sort-value="0.59" | 590 m || 
|-id=665 bgcolor=#d6d6d6
| 440665 ||  || — || December 5, 2005 || Mount Lemmon || Mount Lemmon Survey || — || align=right | 3.8 km || 
|-id=666 bgcolor=#fefefe
| 440666 ||  || — || December 5, 2005 || Mount Lemmon || Mount Lemmon Survey || — || align=right data-sort-value="0.96" | 960 m || 
|-id=667 bgcolor=#d6d6d6
| 440667 ||  || — || November 25, 2005 || Kitt Peak || Spacewatch || HYG || align=right | 2.8 km || 
|-id=668 bgcolor=#d6d6d6
| 440668 ||  || — || December 7, 2005 || Kitt Peak || Spacewatch || — || align=right | 3.0 km || 
|-id=669 bgcolor=#d6d6d6
| 440669 ||  || — || December 10, 2005 || Kitt Peak || Spacewatch || EOS || align=right | 1.5 km || 
|-id=670 bgcolor=#fefefe
| 440670 ||  || — || December 22, 2005 || Nogales || J.-C. Merlin || — || align=right data-sort-value="0.74" | 740 m || 
|-id=671 bgcolor=#fefefe
| 440671 ||  || — || December 22, 2005 || Kitt Peak || Spacewatch || — || align=right data-sort-value="0.62" | 620 m || 
|-id=672 bgcolor=#fefefe
| 440672 ||  || — || December 23, 2005 || Kitt Peak || Spacewatch || — || align=right data-sort-value="0.70" | 700 m || 
|-id=673 bgcolor=#d6d6d6
| 440673 ||  || — || November 25, 2005 || Kitt Peak || Spacewatch || — || align=right | 3.1 km || 
|-id=674 bgcolor=#fefefe
| 440674 ||  || — || December 24, 2005 || Kitt Peak || Spacewatch || — || align=right data-sort-value="0.97" | 970 m || 
|-id=675 bgcolor=#E9E9E9
| 440675 ||  || — || December 24, 2005 || Kitt Peak || Spacewatch || (5) || align=right | 1.9 km || 
|-id=676 bgcolor=#fefefe
| 440676 ||  || — || December 22, 2005 || Kitt Peak || Spacewatch || V || align=right data-sort-value="0.62" | 620 m || 
|-id=677 bgcolor=#d6d6d6
| 440677 ||  || — || December 4, 2005 || Mount Lemmon || Mount Lemmon Survey || — || align=right | 2.7 km || 
|-id=678 bgcolor=#d6d6d6
| 440678 ||  || — || December 24, 2005 || Kitt Peak || Spacewatch || — || align=right | 3.8 km || 
|-id=679 bgcolor=#fefefe
| 440679 ||  || — || December 25, 2005 || Kitt Peak || Spacewatch || — || align=right data-sort-value="0.98" | 980 m || 
|-id=680 bgcolor=#FA8072
| 440680 ||  || — || December 23, 2005 || Mauna Kea || D. J. Tholen || unusual || align=right | 1.4 km || 
|-id=681 bgcolor=#d6d6d6
| 440681 ||  || — || December 21, 2005 || Catalina || CSS || — || align=right | 4.5 km || 
|-id=682 bgcolor=#fefefe
| 440682 ||  || — || December 22, 2005 || Kitt Peak || Spacewatch || — || align=right data-sort-value="0.93" | 930 m || 
|-id=683 bgcolor=#fefefe
| 440683 ||  || — || December 21, 2005 || Catalina || CSS || H || align=right data-sort-value="0.85" | 850 m || 
|-id=684 bgcolor=#d6d6d6
| 440684 ||  || — || December 25, 2005 || Mount Lemmon || Mount Lemmon Survey || — || align=right | 2.6 km || 
|-id=685 bgcolor=#d6d6d6
| 440685 ||  || — || December 24, 2005 || Kitt Peak || Spacewatch || THM || align=right | 2.3 km || 
|-id=686 bgcolor=#d6d6d6
| 440686 ||  || — || December 24, 2005 || Kitt Peak || Spacewatch || THM || align=right | 2.2 km || 
|-id=687 bgcolor=#fefefe
| 440687 ||  || — || December 24, 2005 || Kitt Peak || Spacewatch || — || align=right data-sort-value="0.68" | 680 m || 
|-id=688 bgcolor=#fefefe
| 440688 ||  || — || December 24, 2005 || Kitt Peak || Spacewatch || — || align=right data-sort-value="0.62" | 620 m || 
|-id=689 bgcolor=#d6d6d6
| 440689 ||  || — || December 26, 2005 || Kitt Peak || Spacewatch || — || align=right | 3.5 km || 
|-id=690 bgcolor=#fefefe
| 440690 ||  || — || December 24, 2005 || Kitt Peak || Spacewatch || MAS || align=right data-sort-value="0.59" | 590 m || 
|-id=691 bgcolor=#fefefe
| 440691 ||  || — || December 24, 2005 || Kitt Peak || Spacewatch || — || align=right data-sort-value="0.96" | 960 m || 
|-id=692 bgcolor=#d6d6d6
| 440692 ||  || — || December 24, 2005 || Kitt Peak || Spacewatch || — || align=right | 2.9 km || 
|-id=693 bgcolor=#d6d6d6
| 440693 ||  || — || December 24, 2005 || Kitt Peak || Spacewatch || HYG || align=right | 2.3 km || 
|-id=694 bgcolor=#fefefe
| 440694 ||  || — || December 24, 2005 || Kitt Peak || Spacewatch || V || align=right data-sort-value="0.80" | 800 m || 
|-id=695 bgcolor=#fefefe
| 440695 ||  || — || December 24, 2005 || Kitt Peak || Spacewatch || V || align=right data-sort-value="0.68" | 680 m || 
|-id=696 bgcolor=#fefefe
| 440696 ||  || — || December 10, 2005 || Catalina || CSS || H || align=right data-sort-value="0.64" | 640 m || 
|-id=697 bgcolor=#fefefe
| 440697 ||  || — || December 26, 2005 || Catalina || CSS || — || align=right data-sort-value="0.83" | 830 m || 
|-id=698 bgcolor=#fefefe
| 440698 ||  || — || December 22, 2005 || Catalina || CSS || H || align=right data-sort-value="0.69" | 690 m || 
|-id=699 bgcolor=#d6d6d6
| 440699 ||  || — || December 25, 2005 || Kitt Peak || Spacewatch || LIX || align=right | 3.5 km || 
|-id=700 bgcolor=#d6d6d6
| 440700 ||  || — || December 2, 2005 || Mount Lemmon || Mount Lemmon Survey || — || align=right | 2.3 km || 
|}

440701–440800 

|-bgcolor=#d6d6d6
| 440701 ||  || — || December 25, 2005 || Kitt Peak || Spacewatch || TIR || align=right | 3.0 km || 
|-id=702 bgcolor=#fefefe
| 440702 ||  || — || December 26, 2005 || Kitt Peak || Spacewatch || NYS || align=right data-sort-value="0.52" | 520 m || 
|-id=703 bgcolor=#fefefe
| 440703 ||  || — || December 25, 2005 || Mount Lemmon || Mount Lemmon Survey || — || align=right data-sort-value="0.95" | 950 m || 
|-id=704 bgcolor=#d6d6d6
| 440704 ||  || — || December 28, 2005 || Mount Lemmon || Mount Lemmon Survey || — || align=right | 3.8 km || 
|-id=705 bgcolor=#d6d6d6
| 440705 ||  || — || December 29, 2005 || Kitt Peak || Spacewatch || — || align=right | 3.9 km || 
|-id=706 bgcolor=#fefefe
| 440706 ||  || — || December 27, 2005 || Kitt Peak || Spacewatch || — || align=right data-sort-value="0.75" | 750 m || 
|-id=707 bgcolor=#fefefe
| 440707 ||  || — || December 24, 2005 || Socorro || LINEAR || — || align=right data-sort-value="0.80" | 800 m || 
|-id=708 bgcolor=#d6d6d6
| 440708 ||  || — || December 30, 2005 || Kitt Peak || Spacewatch || — || align=right | 2.6 km || 
|-id=709 bgcolor=#fefefe
| 440709 ||  || — || December 30, 2005 || Kitt Peak || Spacewatch || — || align=right data-sort-value="0.82" | 820 m || 
|-id=710 bgcolor=#fefefe
| 440710 ||  || — || November 30, 2005 || Mount Lemmon || Mount Lemmon Survey || — || align=right data-sort-value="0.86" | 860 m || 
|-id=711 bgcolor=#d6d6d6
| 440711 ||  || — || December 31, 2005 || Kitt Peak || Spacewatch || — || align=right | 3.5 km || 
|-id=712 bgcolor=#fefefe
| 440712 ||  || — || December 22, 2005 || Kitt Peak || Spacewatch || — || align=right data-sort-value="0.71" | 710 m || 
|-id=713 bgcolor=#fefefe
| 440713 ||  || — || December 22, 2005 || Kitt Peak || Spacewatch || — || align=right data-sort-value="0.86" | 860 m || 
|-id=714 bgcolor=#d6d6d6
| 440714 ||  || — || December 31, 2005 || Kitt Peak || Spacewatch || THM || align=right | 2.0 km || 
|-id=715 bgcolor=#fefefe
| 440715 ||  || — || December 27, 2005 || Nyukasa || Mount Nyukasa Stn. || — || align=right data-sort-value="0.88" | 880 m || 
|-id=716 bgcolor=#fefefe
| 440716 ||  || — || December 30, 2005 || Kitt Peak || Spacewatch || — || align=right data-sort-value="0.62" | 620 m || 
|-id=717 bgcolor=#d6d6d6
| 440717 ||  || — || December 28, 2005 || Kitt Peak || Spacewatch || TIR || align=right | 3.4 km || 
|-id=718 bgcolor=#d6d6d6
| 440718 ||  || — || October 30, 2005 || Kitt Peak || Spacewatch || — || align=right | 3.4 km || 
|-id=719 bgcolor=#d6d6d6
| 440719 ||  || — || December 6, 2005 || Mount Lemmon || Mount Lemmon Survey || — || align=right | 3.3 km || 
|-id=720 bgcolor=#fefefe
| 440720 ||  || — || December 4, 2005 || Mount Lemmon || Mount Lemmon Survey || — || align=right data-sort-value="0.76" | 760 m || 
|-id=721 bgcolor=#fefefe
| 440721 ||  || — || January 5, 2006 || Kitt Peak || Spacewatch || — || align=right data-sort-value="0.70" | 700 m || 
|-id=722 bgcolor=#fefefe
| 440722 ||  || — || January 4, 2006 || Mount Lemmon || Mount Lemmon Survey || — || align=right data-sort-value="0.85" | 850 m || 
|-id=723 bgcolor=#fefefe
| 440723 ||  || — || January 4, 2006 || Kitt Peak || Spacewatch || — || align=right data-sort-value="0.78" | 780 m || 
|-id=724 bgcolor=#fefefe
| 440724 ||  || — || January 7, 2006 || Mount Lemmon || Mount Lemmon Survey || — || align=right data-sort-value="0.86" | 860 m || 
|-id=725 bgcolor=#fefefe
| 440725 ||  || — || January 7, 2006 || Anderson Mesa || LONEOS || — || align=right | 1.4 km || 
|-id=726 bgcolor=#d6d6d6
| 440726 ||  || — || December 30, 2005 || Kitt Peak || Spacewatch || — || align=right | 3.1 km || 
|-id=727 bgcolor=#fefefe
| 440727 ||  || — || January 5, 2006 || Kitt Peak || Spacewatch || — || align=right data-sort-value="0.75" | 750 m || 
|-id=728 bgcolor=#fefefe
| 440728 ||  || — || January 4, 2006 || Mount Lemmon || Mount Lemmon Survey || — || align=right data-sort-value="0.59" | 590 m || 
|-id=729 bgcolor=#d6d6d6
| 440729 ||  || — || January 6, 2006 || Kitt Peak || Spacewatch || 7:4 || align=right | 3.6 km || 
|-id=730 bgcolor=#fefefe
| 440730 ||  || — || January 5, 2006 || Kitt Peak || Spacewatch || — || align=right data-sort-value="0.82" | 820 m || 
|-id=731 bgcolor=#d6d6d6
| 440731 ||  || — || October 5, 2005 || Kitt Peak || Spacewatch || — || align=right | 3.6 km || 
|-id=732 bgcolor=#fefefe
| 440732 ||  || — || January 23, 2006 || Mount Lemmon || Mount Lemmon Survey || H || align=right data-sort-value="0.60" | 600 m || 
|-id=733 bgcolor=#d6d6d6
| 440733 ||  || — || January 22, 2006 || Mount Lemmon || Mount Lemmon Survey || — || align=right | 3.8 km || 
|-id=734 bgcolor=#fefefe
| 440734 ||  || — || January 22, 2006 || Mount Lemmon || Mount Lemmon Survey || V || align=right data-sort-value="0.76" | 760 m || 
|-id=735 bgcolor=#fefefe
| 440735 ||  || — || January 25, 2006 || Kitt Peak || Spacewatch || H || align=right data-sort-value="0.53" | 530 m || 
|-id=736 bgcolor=#fefefe
| 440736 ||  || — || January 25, 2006 || Kitt Peak || Spacewatch || — || align=right data-sort-value="0.83" | 830 m || 
|-id=737 bgcolor=#fefefe
| 440737 ||  || — || January 7, 2006 || Mount Lemmon || Mount Lemmon Survey || — || align=right data-sort-value="0.89" | 890 m || 
|-id=738 bgcolor=#fefefe
| 440738 ||  || — || January 7, 2006 || Kitt Peak || Spacewatch || NYS || align=right data-sort-value="0.74" | 740 m || 
|-id=739 bgcolor=#fefefe
| 440739 ||  || — || January 25, 2006 || Kitt Peak || Spacewatch || — || align=right | 1.0 km || 
|-id=740 bgcolor=#fefefe
| 440740 ||  || — || January 26, 2006 || Kitt Peak || Spacewatch || V || align=right data-sort-value="0.62" | 620 m || 
|-id=741 bgcolor=#d6d6d6
| 440741 ||  || — || January 25, 2006 || Kitt Peak || Spacewatch || THM || align=right | 2.5 km || 
|-id=742 bgcolor=#fefefe
| 440742 ||  || — || January 23, 2006 || Kitt Peak || Spacewatch || — || align=right data-sort-value="0.85" | 850 m || 
|-id=743 bgcolor=#fefefe
| 440743 ||  || — || January 25, 2006 || Kitt Peak || Spacewatch || — || align=right data-sort-value="0.87" | 870 m || 
|-id=744 bgcolor=#fefefe
| 440744 ||  || — || January 31, 2006 || Kitt Peak || Spacewatch || — || align=right data-sort-value="0.89" | 890 m || 
|-id=745 bgcolor=#d6d6d6
| 440745 ||  || — || January 8, 2006 || Mount Lemmon || Mount Lemmon Survey || — || align=right | 3.0 km || 
|-id=746 bgcolor=#fefefe
| 440746 ||  || — || January 31, 2006 || Kitt Peak || Spacewatch || — || align=right | 1.1 km || 
|-id=747 bgcolor=#fefefe
| 440747 ||  || — || January 28, 2006 || Anderson Mesa || LONEOS || H || align=right data-sort-value="0.82" | 820 m || 
|-id=748 bgcolor=#fefefe
| 440748 ||  || — || February 2, 2006 || Mount Lemmon || Mount Lemmon Survey || H || align=right data-sort-value="0.58" | 580 m || 
|-id=749 bgcolor=#E9E9E9
| 440749 ||  || — || February 20, 2006 || Kitt Peak || Spacewatch || — || align=right data-sort-value="0.71" | 710 m || 
|-id=750 bgcolor=#E9E9E9
| 440750 ||  || — || February 20, 2006 || Mount Lemmon || Mount Lemmon Survey || — || align=right | 1.7 km || 
|-id=751 bgcolor=#fefefe
| 440751 ||  || — || February 20, 2006 || Mount Lemmon || Mount Lemmon Survey || H || align=right data-sort-value="0.75" | 750 m || 
|-id=752 bgcolor=#fefefe
| 440752 ||  || — || February 24, 2006 || Socorro || LINEAR || H || align=right data-sort-value="0.89" | 890 m || 
|-id=753 bgcolor=#d6d6d6
| 440753 ||  || — || February 24, 2006 || Kitt Peak || Spacewatch || — || align=right | 3.2 km || 
|-id=754 bgcolor=#E9E9E9
| 440754 ||  || — || February 25, 2006 || Kitt Peak || Spacewatch || — || align=right data-sort-value="0.82" | 820 m || 
|-id=755 bgcolor=#E9E9E9
| 440755 ||  || — || February 27, 2006 || Kitt Peak || Spacewatch || EUN || align=right data-sort-value="0.96" | 960 m || 
|-id=756 bgcolor=#fefefe
| 440756 ||  || — || February 27, 2006 || Kitt Peak || Spacewatch || H || align=right data-sort-value="0.68" | 680 m || 
|-id=757 bgcolor=#E9E9E9
| 440757 ||  || — || February 21, 2006 || Mount Lemmon || Mount Lemmon Survey || — || align=right | 1.00 km || 
|-id=758 bgcolor=#E9E9E9
| 440758 ||  || — || March 2, 2006 || Kitt Peak || Spacewatch || — || align=right data-sort-value="0.84" | 840 m || 
|-id=759 bgcolor=#fefefe
| 440759 ||  || — || March 3, 2006 || Kitt Peak || Spacewatch || H || align=right data-sort-value="0.52" | 520 m || 
|-id=760 bgcolor=#FA8072
| 440760 ||  || — || March 4, 2006 || Catalina || CSS || — || align=right | 2.1 km || 
|-id=761 bgcolor=#E9E9E9
| 440761 ||  || — || February 2, 2006 || Mount Lemmon || Mount Lemmon Survey || — || align=right data-sort-value="0.86" | 860 m || 
|-id=762 bgcolor=#fefefe
| 440762 ||  || — || March 23, 2006 || Mount Lemmon || Mount Lemmon Survey || — || align=right | 1.1 km || 
|-id=763 bgcolor=#E9E9E9
| 440763 ||  || — || March 23, 2006 || Mount Lemmon || Mount Lemmon Survey || — || align=right | 2.1 km || 
|-id=764 bgcolor=#E9E9E9
| 440764 ||  || — || March 23, 2006 || Mount Lemmon || Mount Lemmon Survey || — || align=right | 1.2 km || 
|-id=765 bgcolor=#fefefe
| 440765 ||  || — || April 2, 2006 || Catalina || CSS || H || align=right data-sort-value="0.81" | 810 m || 
|-id=766 bgcolor=#E9E9E9
| 440766 ||  || — || April 2, 2006 || Kitt Peak || Spacewatch || — || align=right data-sort-value="0.82" | 820 m || 
|-id=767 bgcolor=#fefefe
| 440767 ||  || — || April 2, 2006 || Kitt Peak || Spacewatch || — || align=right data-sort-value="0.81" | 810 m || 
|-id=768 bgcolor=#E9E9E9
| 440768 ||  || — || April 7, 2006 || Mount Lemmon || Mount Lemmon Survey || — || align=right data-sort-value="0.78" | 780 m || 
|-id=769 bgcolor=#E9E9E9
| 440769 ||  || — || April 20, 2006 || Kitt Peak || Spacewatch || — || align=right | 1.2 km || 
|-id=770 bgcolor=#E9E9E9
| 440770 ||  || — || April 20, 2006 || Kitt Peak || Spacewatch || MAR || align=right | 1.0 km || 
|-id=771 bgcolor=#E9E9E9
| 440771 ||  || — || March 5, 2006 || Kitt Peak || Spacewatch || — || align=right | 1.7 km || 
|-id=772 bgcolor=#E9E9E9
| 440772 ||  || — || April 21, 2006 || Kitt Peak || Spacewatch || — || align=right | 1.1 km || 
|-id=773 bgcolor=#E9E9E9
| 440773 ||  || — || April 21, 2006 || Kitt Peak || Spacewatch || — || align=right data-sort-value="0.83" | 830 m || 
|-id=774 bgcolor=#E9E9E9
| 440774 ||  || — || April 23, 2006 || Catalina || CSS || — || align=right | 1.2 km || 
|-id=775 bgcolor=#E9E9E9
| 440775 ||  || — || April 24, 2006 || Kitt Peak || Spacewatch || EUN || align=right | 1.3 km || 
|-id=776 bgcolor=#E9E9E9
| 440776 ||  || — || April 26, 2006 || Kitt Peak || Spacewatch || — || align=right | 1.3 km || 
|-id=777 bgcolor=#E9E9E9
| 440777 ||  || — || April 30, 2006 || Kitt Peak || Spacewatch || — || align=right data-sort-value="0.88" | 880 m || 
|-id=778 bgcolor=#E9E9E9
| 440778 ||  || — || April 24, 2006 || Kitt Peak || Spacewatch || — || align=right data-sort-value="0.80" | 800 m || 
|-id=779 bgcolor=#E9E9E9
| 440779 ||  || — || May 5, 2006 || Anderson Mesa || LONEOS || — || align=right | 1.8 km || 
|-id=780 bgcolor=#E9E9E9
| 440780 ||  || — || May 6, 2006 || Mount Lemmon || Mount Lemmon Survey || — || align=right | 1.1 km || 
|-id=781 bgcolor=#E9E9E9
| 440781 ||  || — || May 21, 2006 || Kitt Peak || Spacewatch || JUN || align=right data-sort-value="0.91" | 910 m || 
|-id=782 bgcolor=#E9E9E9
| 440782 ||  || — || April 20, 2006 || Catalina || CSS || — || align=right | 1.2 km || 
|-id=783 bgcolor=#E9E9E9
| 440783 ||  || — || May 21, 2006 || Kitt Peak || Spacewatch || EUN || align=right data-sort-value="0.99" | 990 m || 
|-id=784 bgcolor=#E9E9E9
| 440784 ||  || — || May 22, 2006 || Kitt Peak || Spacewatch || — || align=right data-sort-value="0.84" | 840 m || 
|-id=785 bgcolor=#E9E9E9
| 440785 ||  || — || May 23, 2006 || Kitt Peak || Spacewatch || EUN || align=right | 1.5 km || 
|-id=786 bgcolor=#E9E9E9
| 440786 ||  || — || January 16, 2005 || Kitt Peak || Spacewatch || EUN || align=right | 1.7 km || 
|-id=787 bgcolor=#E9E9E9
| 440787 ||  || — || May 8, 2006 || Kitt Peak || Spacewatch || — || align=right | 1.5 km || 
|-id=788 bgcolor=#E9E9E9
| 440788 ||  || — || May 25, 2006 || Kitt Peak || Spacewatch || critical || align=right | 1.2 km || 
|-id=789 bgcolor=#E9E9E9
| 440789 ||  || — || May 25, 2006 || Kitt Peak || Spacewatch || — || align=right | 1.3 km || 
|-id=790 bgcolor=#E9E9E9
| 440790 ||  || — || May 8, 2006 || Mount Lemmon || Mount Lemmon Survey || — || align=right | 1.4 km || 
|-id=791 bgcolor=#E9E9E9
| 440791 ||  || — || June 18, 2006 || Kitt Peak || Spacewatch || — || align=right | 1.8 km || 
|-id=792 bgcolor=#E9E9E9
| 440792 ||  || — || June 19, 2006 || Mount Lemmon || Mount Lemmon Survey || JUN || align=right | 1.4 km || 
|-id=793 bgcolor=#E9E9E9
| 440793 ||  || — || July 25, 2006 || Ottmarsheim || C. Rinner || — || align=right | 2.2 km || 
|-id=794 bgcolor=#E9E9E9
| 440794 ||  || — || July 28, 2006 || Andrushivka || Andrushivka Obs. || — || align=right | 2.8 km || 
|-id=795 bgcolor=#E9E9E9
| 440795 ||  || — || July 18, 2006 || Mount Lemmon || Mount Lemmon Survey || — || align=right | 2.0 km || 
|-id=796 bgcolor=#E9E9E9
| 440796 ||  || — || July 22, 2006 || Mount Lemmon || Mount Lemmon Survey ||  || align=right | 2.2 km || 
|-id=797 bgcolor=#E9E9E9
| 440797 ||  || — || August 12, 2006 || Palomar || NEAT || — || align=right | 3.2 km || 
|-id=798 bgcolor=#E9E9E9
| 440798 ||  || — || August 12, 2006 || Palomar || NEAT || JUN || align=right | 1.0 km || 
|-id=799 bgcolor=#FA8072
| 440799 ||  || — || August 13, 2006 || Palomar || NEAT || — || align=right data-sort-value="0.28" | 280 m || 
|-id=800 bgcolor=#E9E9E9
| 440800 ||  || — || August 15, 2006 || Palomar || NEAT || — || align=right | 2.7 km || 
|}

440801–440900 

|-bgcolor=#E9E9E9
| 440801 ||  || — || July 21, 2006 || Mount Lemmon || Mount Lemmon Survey || — || align=right | 1.5 km || 
|-id=802 bgcolor=#E9E9E9
| 440802 ||  || — || August 13, 2006 || Palomar || NEAT || — || align=right | 2.8 km || 
|-id=803 bgcolor=#E9E9E9
| 440803 ||  || — || August 18, 2006 || Kitt Peak || Spacewatch || — || align=right | 1.8 km || 
|-id=804 bgcolor=#E9E9E9
| 440804 ||  || — || August 17, 2006 || Palomar || NEAT || AEO || align=right | 1.1 km || 
|-id=805 bgcolor=#E9E9E9
| 440805 ||  || — || August 22, 2006 || Palomar || NEAT || AEO || align=right | 1.0 km || 
|-id=806 bgcolor=#E9E9E9
| 440806 ||  || — || August 19, 2006 || Kitt Peak || Spacewatch || — || align=right | 1.7 km || 
|-id=807 bgcolor=#E9E9E9
| 440807 ||  || — || August 24, 2006 || Socorro || LINEAR || — || align=right | 3.7 km || 
|-id=808 bgcolor=#E9E9E9
| 440808 ||  || — || August 22, 2006 || Palomar || NEAT || — || align=right | 2.0 km || 
|-id=809 bgcolor=#E9E9E9
| 440809 ||  || — || August 27, 2006 || Kitt Peak || Spacewatch || — || align=right | 1.7 km || 
|-id=810 bgcolor=#E9E9E9
| 440810 ||  || — || August 19, 2006 || Palomar || NEAT || — || align=right | 2.8 km || 
|-id=811 bgcolor=#E9E9E9
| 440811 ||  || — || August 18, 2006 || Kitt Peak || Spacewatch || — || align=right | 2.0 km || 
|-id=812 bgcolor=#E9E9E9
| 440812 ||  || — || August 28, 2006 || Catalina || CSS || — || align=right | 1.6 km || 
|-id=813 bgcolor=#E9E9E9
| 440813 ||  || — || August 28, 2006 || Socorro || LINEAR || — || align=right | 2.9 km || 
|-id=814 bgcolor=#E9E9E9
| 440814 ||  || — || August 18, 2006 || Anderson Mesa || LONEOS || — || align=right | 1.9 km || 
|-id=815 bgcolor=#E9E9E9
| 440815 ||  || — || August 16, 2006 || Palomar || NEAT || — || align=right | 2.0 km || 
|-id=816 bgcolor=#E9E9E9
| 440816 ||  || — || August 24, 2006 || Palomar || NEAT || — || align=right | 2.6 km || 
|-id=817 bgcolor=#E9E9E9
| 440817 ||  || — || August 18, 2006 || Kitt Peak || Spacewatch || — || align=right | 1.9 km || 
|-id=818 bgcolor=#E9E9E9
| 440818 ||  || — || August 19, 2006 || Kitt Peak || Spacewatch || — || align=right | 1.8 km || 
|-id=819 bgcolor=#E9E9E9
| 440819 ||  || — || August 19, 2006 || Kitt Peak || Spacewatch || — || align=right | 1.6 km || 
|-id=820 bgcolor=#E9E9E9
| 440820 ||  || — || September 3, 2006 || Cordell-Lorenz || Cordell–Lorenz Obs. || — || align=right | 2.8 km || 
|-id=821 bgcolor=#E9E9E9
| 440821 ||  || — || September 12, 2006 || Catalina || CSS || — || align=right | 2.5 km || 
|-id=822 bgcolor=#E9E9E9
| 440822 ||  || — || September 14, 2006 || Catalina || CSS || — || align=right | 1.7 km || 
|-id=823 bgcolor=#E9E9E9
| 440823 ||  || — || September 12, 2006 || Catalina || CSS || — || align=right | 1.9 km || 
|-id=824 bgcolor=#E9E9E9
| 440824 ||  || — || September 12, 2006 || Catalina || CSS || JUN || align=right | 1.2 km || 
|-id=825 bgcolor=#E9E9E9
| 440825 ||  || — || September 14, 2006 || Catalina || CSS || — || align=right | 2.2 km || 
|-id=826 bgcolor=#E9E9E9
| 440826 ||  || — || September 14, 2006 || Palomar || NEAT || — || align=right | 2.8 km || 
|-id=827 bgcolor=#E9E9E9
| 440827 ||  || — || September 12, 2006 || Catalina || CSS || — || align=right | 2.1 km || 
|-id=828 bgcolor=#d6d6d6
| 440828 ||  || — || September 14, 2006 || Kitt Peak || Spacewatch || — || align=right | 2.9 km || 
|-id=829 bgcolor=#E9E9E9
| 440829 ||  || — || September 14, 2006 || Kitt Peak || Spacewatch || AGN || align=right data-sort-value="0.85" | 850 m || 
|-id=830 bgcolor=#E9E9E9
| 440830 ||  || — || August 27, 2006 || Anderson Mesa || LONEOS ||  || align=right | 2.0 km || 
|-id=831 bgcolor=#E9E9E9
| 440831 ||  || — || September 15, 2006 || Kitt Peak || Spacewatch || — || align=right | 2.8 km || 
|-id=832 bgcolor=#E9E9E9
| 440832 ||  || — || September 15, 2006 || Kitt Peak || Spacewatch || — || align=right | 2.4 km || 
|-id=833 bgcolor=#d6d6d6
| 440833 ||  || — || September 14, 2006 || Mauna Kea || J. Masiero || KOR || align=right | 1.2 km || 
|-id=834 bgcolor=#E9E9E9
| 440834 ||  || — || February 17, 2004 || Kitt Peak || Spacewatch || — || align=right | 2.2 km || 
|-id=835 bgcolor=#E9E9E9
| 440835 ||  || — || September 16, 2006 || Anderson Mesa || LONEOS || — || align=right | 2.1 km || 
|-id=836 bgcolor=#d6d6d6
| 440836 ||  || — || September 17, 2006 || Kitt Peak || Spacewatch || — || align=right | 1.8 km || 
|-id=837 bgcolor=#E9E9E9
| 440837 ||  || — || September 17, 2006 || Kitt Peak || Spacewatch || — || align=right | 2.2 km || 
|-id=838 bgcolor=#E9E9E9
| 440838 ||  || — || September 16, 2006 || Catalina || CSS || — || align=right | 2.8 km || 
|-id=839 bgcolor=#E9E9E9
| 440839 ||  || — || September 18, 2006 || Kitt Peak || Spacewatch || — || align=right | 2.3 km || 
|-id=840 bgcolor=#E9E9E9
| 440840 ||  || — || September 18, 2006 || Catalina || CSS || — || align=right | 2.1 km || 
|-id=841 bgcolor=#E9E9E9
| 440841 ||  || — || September 17, 2006 || Catalina || CSS || — || align=right | 2.4 km || 
|-id=842 bgcolor=#E9E9E9
| 440842 ||  || — || September 14, 2006 || Kitt Peak || Spacewatch || GEF || align=right | 1.2 km || 
|-id=843 bgcolor=#d6d6d6
| 440843 ||  || — || September 19, 2006 || Kitt Peak || Spacewatch || — || align=right | 1.7 km || 
|-id=844 bgcolor=#E9E9E9
| 440844 ||  || — || September 19, 2006 || Socorro || LINEAR || — || align=right | 3.2 km || 
|-id=845 bgcolor=#d6d6d6
| 440845 ||  || — || September 19, 2006 || Kitt Peak || Spacewatch || KOR || align=right | 1.2 km || 
|-id=846 bgcolor=#E9E9E9
| 440846 ||  || — || August 27, 2006 || Kitt Peak || Spacewatch || HOF || align=right | 2.1 km || 
|-id=847 bgcolor=#E9E9E9
| 440847 ||  || — || September 22, 2006 || Anderson Mesa || LONEOS || — || align=right | 2.0 km || 
|-id=848 bgcolor=#d6d6d6
| 440848 ||  || — || September 21, 2006 || Anderson Mesa || LONEOS || — || align=right | 2.4 km || 
|-id=849 bgcolor=#E9E9E9
| 440849 ||  || — || September 22, 2006 || Catalina || CSS || — || align=right | 2.3 km || 
|-id=850 bgcolor=#E9E9E9
| 440850 ||  || — || September 23, 2006 || Kitt Peak || Spacewatch || — || align=right | 2.0 km || 
|-id=851 bgcolor=#E9E9E9
| 440851 ||  || — || September 18, 2006 || Kitt Peak || Spacewatch || — || align=right | 1.6 km || 
|-id=852 bgcolor=#E9E9E9
| 440852 ||  || — || September 20, 2006 || Kitt Peak || Spacewatch || — || align=right | 1.9 km || 
|-id=853 bgcolor=#E9E9E9
| 440853 ||  || — || September 18, 2006 || Kitt Peak || Spacewatch || — || align=right | 1.9 km || 
|-id=854 bgcolor=#E9E9E9
| 440854 ||  || — || September 25, 2006 || Catalina || CSS || — || align=right | 3.6 km || 
|-id=855 bgcolor=#E9E9E9
| 440855 ||  || — || September 24, 2006 || Kitt Peak || Spacewatch || — || align=right | 2.4 km || 
|-id=856 bgcolor=#E9E9E9
| 440856 ||  || — || August 29, 2006 || Anderson Mesa || LONEOS || — || align=right | 2.9 km || 
|-id=857 bgcolor=#d6d6d6
| 440857 ||  || — || September 26, 2006 || Kitt Peak || Spacewatch || — || align=right | 2.2 km || 
|-id=858 bgcolor=#d6d6d6
| 440858 ||  || — || September 28, 2006 || Kitt Peak || Spacewatch || KOR || align=right | 1.4 km || 
|-id=859 bgcolor=#E9E9E9
| 440859 ||  || — || September 21, 2006 || Anderson Mesa || LONEOS || DOR || align=right | 2.5 km || 
|-id=860 bgcolor=#E9E9E9
| 440860 ||  || — || September 30, 2006 || Catalina || CSS || — || align=right | 1.8 km || 
|-id=861 bgcolor=#E9E9E9
| 440861 ||  || — || September 25, 2006 || Kitt Peak || Spacewatch || — || align=right | 2.0 km || 
|-id=862 bgcolor=#E9E9E9
| 440862 ||  || — || September 27, 2006 || Kitt Peak || Spacewatch || AGN || align=right data-sort-value="0.98" | 980 m || 
|-id=863 bgcolor=#E9E9E9
| 440863 ||  || — || September 28, 2006 || Kitt Peak || Spacewatch || DOR || align=right | 2.5 km || 
|-id=864 bgcolor=#E9E9E9
| 440864 ||  || — || July 22, 2006 || Mount Lemmon || Mount Lemmon Survey || — || align=right | 2.5 km || 
|-id=865 bgcolor=#E9E9E9
| 440865 ||  || — || September 18, 2006 || Apache Point || A. C. Becker || DOR || align=right | 2.1 km || 
|-id=866 bgcolor=#d6d6d6
| 440866 ||  || — || September 29, 2006 || Apache Point || A. C. Becker || EOS || align=right | 1.9 km || 
|-id=867 bgcolor=#E9E9E9
| 440867 ||  || — || September 25, 2006 || Catalina || CSS || — || align=right | 2.1 km || 
|-id=868 bgcolor=#E9E9E9
| 440868 ||  || — || September 17, 2006 || Kitt Peak || Spacewatch || — || align=right | 1.9 km || 
|-id=869 bgcolor=#E9E9E9
| 440869 ||  || — || September 26, 2006 || Kitt Peak || Spacewatch || AGN || align=right | 1.1 km || 
|-id=870 bgcolor=#E9E9E9
| 440870 ||  || — || October 3, 2006 || Kitt Peak || Spacewatch || — || align=right | 2.0 km || 
|-id=871 bgcolor=#E9E9E9
| 440871 ||  || — || October 10, 2006 || Palomar || NEAT || — || align=right | 1.5 km || 
|-id=872 bgcolor=#d6d6d6
| 440872 ||  || — || September 27, 2006 || Mount Lemmon || Mount Lemmon Survey || — || align=right | 2.4 km || 
|-id=873 bgcolor=#E9E9E9
| 440873 ||  || — || October 4, 2006 || Mount Lemmon || Mount Lemmon Survey || — || align=right | 1.8 km || 
|-id=874 bgcolor=#E9E9E9
| 440874 ||  || — || October 12, 2006 || Kitt Peak || Spacewatch || — || align=right | 2.4 km || 
|-id=875 bgcolor=#d6d6d6
| 440875 ||  || — || October 16, 2001 || Kitt Peak || Spacewatch || KOR || align=right | 1.1 km || 
|-id=876 bgcolor=#d6d6d6
| 440876 ||  || — || October 12, 2006 || Kitt Peak || Spacewatch || KOR || align=right | 1.2 km || 
|-id=877 bgcolor=#fefefe
| 440877 ||  || — || October 13, 2006 || Kitt Peak || Spacewatch || — || align=right data-sort-value="0.52" | 520 m || 
|-id=878 bgcolor=#E9E9E9
| 440878 ||  || — || October 9, 2006 || Palomar || NEAT || — || align=right | 2.1 km || 
|-id=879 bgcolor=#E9E9E9
| 440879 ||  || — || October 11, 2006 || Palomar || NEAT || — || align=right | 2.3 km || 
|-id=880 bgcolor=#E9E9E9
| 440880 ||  || — || October 11, 2006 || Palomar || NEAT || — || align=right | 2.4 km || 
|-id=881 bgcolor=#d6d6d6
| 440881 ||  || — || October 13, 2006 || Kitt Peak || Spacewatch || — || align=right | 2.8 km || 
|-id=882 bgcolor=#E9E9E9
| 440882 ||  || — || October 15, 2006 || Kitt Peak || Spacewatch || — || align=right | 1.8 km || 
|-id=883 bgcolor=#E9E9E9
| 440883 ||  || — || October 1, 2006 || Apache Point || A. C. Becker || AGN || align=right | 1.1 km || 
|-id=884 bgcolor=#d6d6d6
| 440884 ||  || — || October 1, 2006 || Apache Point || A. C. Becker || — || align=right | 2.5 km || 
|-id=885 bgcolor=#d6d6d6
| 440885 ||  || — || October 4, 2006 || Mount Lemmon || Mount Lemmon Survey || — || align=right | 2.2 km || 
|-id=886 bgcolor=#d6d6d6
| 440886 ||  || — || October 17, 2006 || Mount Lemmon || Mount Lemmon Survey || — || align=right | 2.9 km || 
|-id=887 bgcolor=#E9E9E9
| 440887 ||  || — || September 30, 2006 || Kitt Peak || Spacewatch || — || align=right | 1.7 km || 
|-id=888 bgcolor=#d6d6d6
| 440888 ||  || — || September 30, 2006 || Mount Lemmon || Mount Lemmon Survey || — || align=right | 2.2 km || 
|-id=889 bgcolor=#E9E9E9
| 440889 ||  || — || October 17, 2006 || Catalina || CSS || AEO || align=right | 1.2 km || 
|-id=890 bgcolor=#fefefe
| 440890 ||  || — || October 17, 2006 || Mount Lemmon || Mount Lemmon Survey || — || align=right data-sort-value="0.62" | 620 m || 
|-id=891 bgcolor=#d6d6d6
| 440891 ||  || — || September 18, 2006 || Kitt Peak || Spacewatch || KOR || align=right data-sort-value="0.99" | 990 m || 
|-id=892 bgcolor=#E9E9E9
| 440892 ||  || — || September 19, 2006 || Kitt Peak || Spacewatch || — || align=right | 2.2 km || 
|-id=893 bgcolor=#d6d6d6
| 440893 ||  || — || October 19, 2006 || Kitt Peak || Spacewatch || — || align=right | 3.2 km || 
|-id=894 bgcolor=#E9E9E9
| 440894 ||  || — || October 21, 2006 || Mount Lemmon || Mount Lemmon Survey || — || align=right | 2.6 km || 
|-id=895 bgcolor=#d6d6d6
| 440895 ||  || — || October 21, 2006 || Mount Lemmon || Mount Lemmon Survey || KOR || align=right | 1.1 km || 
|-id=896 bgcolor=#E9E9E9
| 440896 ||  || — || September 17, 2006 || Catalina || CSS ||  || align=right | 2.7 km || 
|-id=897 bgcolor=#E9E9E9
| 440897 ||  || — || October 17, 2006 || Catalina || CSS || DOR || align=right | 2.5 km || 
|-id=898 bgcolor=#E9E9E9
| 440898 ||  || — || October 19, 2006 || Mount Lemmon || Mount Lemmon Survey || — || align=right | 2.3 km || 
|-id=899 bgcolor=#E9E9E9
| 440899 ||  || — || October 21, 2006 || Palomar || NEAT || — || align=right | 2.0 km || 
|-id=900 bgcolor=#d6d6d6
| 440900 ||  || — || September 30, 2006 || Mount Lemmon || Mount Lemmon Survey || — || align=right | 2.1 km || 
|}

440901–441000 

|-bgcolor=#E9E9E9
| 440901 ||  || — || October 29, 2006 || Catalina || CSS || DOR || align=right | 2.9 km || 
|-id=902 bgcolor=#d6d6d6
| 440902 ||  || — || October 27, 2006 || Mount Lemmon || Mount Lemmon Survey || — || align=right | 3.4 km || 
|-id=903 bgcolor=#d6d6d6
| 440903 ||  || — || October 22, 2006 || Mount Lemmon || Mount Lemmon Survey || — || align=right | 3.8 km || 
|-id=904 bgcolor=#FA8072
| 440904 ||  || — || November 1, 2006 || Mount Lemmon || Mount Lemmon Survey || — || align=right data-sort-value="0.48" | 480 m || 
|-id=905 bgcolor=#d6d6d6
| 440905 ||  || — || November 2, 2006 || Kitt Peak || Spacewatch || — || align=right | 2.2 km || 
|-id=906 bgcolor=#d6d6d6
| 440906 ||  || — || November 10, 2006 || Kitt Peak || Spacewatch || — || align=right | 3.0 km || 
|-id=907 bgcolor=#fefefe
| 440907 ||  || — || November 11, 2006 || Mount Lemmon || Mount Lemmon Survey || — || align=right data-sort-value="0.50" | 500 m || 
|-id=908 bgcolor=#fefefe
| 440908 ||  || — || November 11, 2006 || Kitt Peak || Spacewatch || — || align=right data-sort-value="0.55" | 550 m || 
|-id=909 bgcolor=#d6d6d6
| 440909 ||  || — || September 17, 2006 || Kitt Peak || Spacewatch || — || align=right | 2.7 km || 
|-id=910 bgcolor=#d6d6d6
| 440910 ||  || — || October 27, 2006 || Mount Lemmon || Mount Lemmon Survey || — || align=right | 2.3 km || 
|-id=911 bgcolor=#d6d6d6
| 440911 ||  || — || November 12, 2006 || Mount Lemmon || Mount Lemmon Survey || VER || align=right | 2.6 km || 
|-id=912 bgcolor=#d6d6d6
| 440912 ||  || — || October 22, 2006 || Mount Lemmon || Mount Lemmon Survey || — || align=right | 3.1 km || 
|-id=913 bgcolor=#E9E9E9
| 440913 ||  || — || October 21, 2006 || Mount Lemmon || Mount Lemmon Survey || — || align=right | 2.2 km || 
|-id=914 bgcolor=#d6d6d6
| 440914 ||  || — || November 13, 2006 || Mount Lemmon || Mount Lemmon Survey || — || align=right | 2.0 km || 
|-id=915 bgcolor=#d6d6d6
| 440915 ||  || — || September 28, 2006 || Mount Lemmon || Mount Lemmon Survey || — || align=right | 2.6 km || 
|-id=916 bgcolor=#d6d6d6
| 440916 ||  || — || November 15, 2006 || Socorro || LINEAR || BRA || align=right | 3.0 km || 
|-id=917 bgcolor=#d6d6d6
| 440917 ||  || — || November 13, 2006 || Kitt Peak || Spacewatch || — || align=right | 2.3 km || 
|-id=918 bgcolor=#d6d6d6
| 440918 ||  || — || October 21, 2006 || Kitt Peak || Spacewatch || EOS || align=right | 1.8 km || 
|-id=919 bgcolor=#d6d6d6
| 440919 ||  || — || November 17, 2006 || Kitt Peak || Spacewatch || — || align=right | 3.4 km || 
|-id=920 bgcolor=#d6d6d6
| 440920 ||  || — || November 18, 2006 || Kitt Peak || Spacewatch || — || align=right | 2.0 km || 
|-id=921 bgcolor=#d6d6d6
| 440921 ||  || — || November 18, 2006 || Kitt Peak || Spacewatch || — || align=right | 2.0 km || 
|-id=922 bgcolor=#d6d6d6
| 440922 ||  || — || November 18, 2006 || Kitt Peak || Spacewatch || — || align=right | 2.6 km || 
|-id=923 bgcolor=#d6d6d6
| 440923 ||  || — || October 23, 2006 || Mount Lemmon || Mount Lemmon Survey || — || align=right | 2.5 km || 
|-id=924 bgcolor=#d6d6d6
| 440924 ||  || — || November 22, 2006 || Mount Lemmon || Mount Lemmon Survey || — || align=right | 2.6 km || 
|-id=925 bgcolor=#d6d6d6
| 440925 ||  || — || November 24, 2006 || Kitt Peak || Spacewatch || BRA || align=right | 1.6 km || 
|-id=926 bgcolor=#d6d6d6
| 440926 ||  || — || September 27, 2006 || Mount Lemmon || Mount Lemmon Survey || — || align=right | 3.3 km || 
|-id=927 bgcolor=#d6d6d6
| 440927 ||  || — || November 26, 2006 || Kitt Peak || Spacewatch || — || align=right | 3.9 km || 
|-id=928 bgcolor=#d6d6d6
| 440928 ||  || — || November 27, 2006 || Mount Lemmon || Mount Lemmon Survey || — || align=right | 3.5 km || 
|-id=929 bgcolor=#d6d6d6
| 440929 ||  || — || December 10, 2006 || Kitt Peak || Spacewatch || — || align=right | 3.9 km || 
|-id=930 bgcolor=#d6d6d6
| 440930 ||  || — || December 11, 2006 || Kitt Peak || Spacewatch || EOS || align=right | 2.2 km || 
|-id=931 bgcolor=#d6d6d6
| 440931 ||  || — || December 11, 2006 || Kitt Peak || Spacewatch || — || align=right | 3.9 km || 
|-id=932 bgcolor=#d6d6d6
| 440932 ||  || — || December 13, 2006 || Kitt Peak || Spacewatch || — || align=right | 3.5 km || 
|-id=933 bgcolor=#d6d6d6
| 440933 ||  || — || November 22, 2006 || Kitt Peak || Spacewatch || — || align=right | 3.3 km || 
|-id=934 bgcolor=#d6d6d6
| 440934 ||  || — || November 27, 2006 || Mount Lemmon || Mount Lemmon Survey || — || align=right | 3.1 km || 
|-id=935 bgcolor=#d6d6d6
| 440935 ||  || — || December 15, 2006 || Kitt Peak || Spacewatch || — || align=right | 2.3 km || 
|-id=936 bgcolor=#fefefe
| 440936 ||  || — || December 13, 2006 || Mount Lemmon || Mount Lemmon Survey || — || align=right data-sort-value="0.74" | 740 m || 
|-id=937 bgcolor=#d6d6d6
| 440937 ||  || — || December 1, 2006 || Mount Lemmon || Mount Lemmon Survey || — || align=right | 4.2 km || 
|-id=938 bgcolor=#fefefe
| 440938 ||  || — || November 27, 2006 || Mount Lemmon || Mount Lemmon Survey || — || align=right | 1.2 km || 
|-id=939 bgcolor=#d6d6d6
| 440939 ||  || — || December 13, 2006 || Mount Lemmon || Mount Lemmon Survey || — || align=right | 4.0 km || 
|-id=940 bgcolor=#FA8072
| 440940 ||  || — || December 21, 2006 || Kitt Peak || Spacewatch || — || align=right data-sort-value="0.68" | 680 m || 
|-id=941 bgcolor=#d6d6d6
| 440941 ||  || — || December 21, 2006 || Kitt Peak || Spacewatch || — || align=right | 2.4 km || 
|-id=942 bgcolor=#d6d6d6
| 440942 ||  || — || December 21, 2006 || Kitt Peak || Spacewatch || — || align=right | 2.6 km || 
|-id=943 bgcolor=#d6d6d6
| 440943 ||  || — || December 20, 2006 || Mount Lemmon || Mount Lemmon Survey || — || align=right | 4.3 km || 
|-id=944 bgcolor=#d6d6d6
| 440944 ||  || — || January 8, 2007 || Eskridge || G. Hug || — || align=right | 4.3 km || 
|-id=945 bgcolor=#fefefe
| 440945 ||  || — || January 8, 2007 || Mount Lemmon || Mount Lemmon Survey || — || align=right data-sort-value="0.58" | 580 m || 
|-id=946 bgcolor=#d6d6d6
| 440946 ||  || — || January 9, 2007 || Kitt Peak || Spacewatch || — || align=right | 4.4 km || 
|-id=947 bgcolor=#d6d6d6
| 440947 ||  || — || January 15, 2007 || Anderson Mesa || LONEOS || — || align=right | 4.3 km || 
|-id=948 bgcolor=#d6d6d6
| 440948 ||  || — || January 15, 2007 || Catalina || CSS || — || align=right | 5.0 km || 
|-id=949 bgcolor=#d6d6d6
| 440949 ||  || — || January 9, 2007 || Mount Lemmon || Mount Lemmon Survey || — || align=right | 2.9 km || 
|-id=950 bgcolor=#d6d6d6
| 440950 ||  || — || January 10, 2007 || Kitt Peak || Spacewatch || EOS || align=right | 2.6 km || 
|-id=951 bgcolor=#d6d6d6
| 440951 ||  || — || January 17, 2007 || Kitt Peak || Spacewatch || — || align=right | 2.9 km || 
|-id=952 bgcolor=#d6d6d6
| 440952 ||  || — || November 27, 2006 || Mount Lemmon || Mount Lemmon Survey || — || align=right | 2.8 km || 
|-id=953 bgcolor=#d6d6d6
| 440953 ||  || — || January 17, 2007 || Kitt Peak || Spacewatch || HYG || align=right | 2.6 km || 
|-id=954 bgcolor=#d6d6d6
| 440954 ||  || — || January 17, 2007 || Kitt Peak || Spacewatch || — || align=right | 3.5 km || 
|-id=955 bgcolor=#fefefe
| 440955 ||  || — || December 26, 2006 || Kitt Peak || Spacewatch || — || align=right data-sort-value="0.76" | 760 m || 
|-id=956 bgcolor=#d6d6d6
| 440956 ||  || — || January 17, 2007 || Kitt Peak || Spacewatch ||  || align=right | 2.7 km || 
|-id=957 bgcolor=#d6d6d6
| 440957 ||  || — || January 24, 2007 || Catalina || CSS || — || align=right | 4.9 km || 
|-id=958 bgcolor=#d6d6d6
| 440958 ||  || — || January 24, 2007 || Mount Lemmon || Mount Lemmon Survey || EOS || align=right | 1.6 km || 
|-id=959 bgcolor=#d6d6d6
| 440959 ||  || — || January 24, 2007 || Mount Lemmon || Mount Lemmon Survey || EOS || align=right | 1.9 km || 
|-id=960 bgcolor=#fefefe
| 440960 ||  || — || January 24, 2007 || Mount Lemmon || Mount Lemmon Survey || — || align=right data-sort-value="0.61" | 610 m || 
|-id=961 bgcolor=#fefefe
| 440961 ||  || — || January 25, 2007 || Kitt Peak || Spacewatch || — || align=right data-sort-value="0.75" | 750 m || 
|-id=962 bgcolor=#fefefe
| 440962 ||  || — || December 27, 2006 || Mount Lemmon || Mount Lemmon Survey || — || align=right data-sort-value="0.68" | 680 m || 
|-id=963 bgcolor=#d6d6d6
| 440963 ||  || — || November 21, 2006 || Mount Lemmon || Mount Lemmon Survey || — || align=right | 2.6 km || 
|-id=964 bgcolor=#d6d6d6
| 440964 ||  || — || November 16, 2006 || Mount Lemmon || Mount Lemmon Survey || — || align=right | 3.9 km || 
|-id=965 bgcolor=#d6d6d6
| 440965 ||  || — || January 28, 2007 || Mount Lemmon || Mount Lemmon Survey || — || align=right | 3.2 km || 
|-id=966 bgcolor=#d6d6d6
| 440966 ||  || — || January 26, 2007 || Kitt Peak || Spacewatch || — || align=right | 4.0 km || 
|-id=967 bgcolor=#d6d6d6
| 440967 ||  || — || January 27, 2007 || Kitt Peak || Spacewatch || — || align=right | 3.4 km || 
|-id=968 bgcolor=#d6d6d6
| 440968 ||  || — || January 27, 2007 || Kitt Peak || Spacewatch || — || align=right | 3.2 km || 
|-id=969 bgcolor=#d6d6d6
| 440969 ||  || — || January 19, 2007 || Mauna Kea || Mauna Kea Obs. || — || align=right | 3.1 km || 
|-id=970 bgcolor=#d6d6d6
| 440970 ||  || — || January 28, 2007 || Kitt Peak || Spacewatch || — || align=right | 3.5 km || 
|-id=971 bgcolor=#d6d6d6
| 440971 ||  || — || January 10, 2007 || Mount Lemmon || Mount Lemmon Survey || — || align=right | 3.1 km || 
|-id=972 bgcolor=#fefefe
| 440972 ||  || — || February 6, 2007 || Kitt Peak || Spacewatch || — || align=right data-sort-value="0.69" | 690 m || 
|-id=973 bgcolor=#d6d6d6
| 440973 ||  || — || February 6, 2007 || Kitt Peak || Spacewatch || (1118) || align=right | 5.0 km || 
|-id=974 bgcolor=#fefefe
| 440974 ||  || — || January 29, 2007 || Kitt Peak || Spacewatch || — || align=right data-sort-value="0.63" | 630 m || 
|-id=975 bgcolor=#fefefe
| 440975 ||  || — || February 6, 2007 || Mount Lemmon || Mount Lemmon Survey || — || align=right data-sort-value="0.80" | 800 m || 
|-id=976 bgcolor=#d6d6d6
| 440976 ||  || — || January 10, 2007 || Kitt Peak || Spacewatch || — || align=right | 3.4 km || 
|-id=977 bgcolor=#d6d6d6
| 440977 ||  || — || January 27, 2007 || Kitt Peak || Spacewatch || — || align=right | 2.6 km || 
|-id=978 bgcolor=#d6d6d6
| 440978 ||  || — || February 6, 2007 || Mount Lemmon || Mount Lemmon Survey || — || align=right | 3.5 km || 
|-id=979 bgcolor=#d6d6d6
| 440979 ||  || — || February 6, 2007 || Mount Lemmon || Mount Lemmon Survey || — || align=right | 3.6 km || 
|-id=980 bgcolor=#d6d6d6
| 440980 ||  || — || January 17, 2007 || Kitt Peak || Spacewatch || HYG || align=right | 2.3 km || 
|-id=981 bgcolor=#d6d6d6
| 440981 ||  || — || February 6, 2007 || Mount Lemmon || Mount Lemmon Survey || — || align=right | 2.6 km || 
|-id=982 bgcolor=#d6d6d6
| 440982 ||  || — || February 6, 2007 || Mount Lemmon || Mount Lemmon Survey || EOS || align=right | 1.9 km || 
|-id=983 bgcolor=#d6d6d6
| 440983 ||  || — || February 7, 2007 || Mount Lemmon || Mount Lemmon Survey || EOS || align=right | 1.6 km || 
|-id=984 bgcolor=#d6d6d6
| 440984 ||  || — || September 12, 2005 || Kitt Peak || Spacewatch || — || align=right | 2.5 km || 
|-id=985 bgcolor=#d6d6d6
| 440985 ||  || — || February 6, 2007 || Kitt Peak || Spacewatch || — || align=right | 3.2 km || 
|-id=986 bgcolor=#d6d6d6
| 440986 ||  || — || February 17, 2007 || Kitt Peak || Spacewatch || — || align=right | 3.1 km || 
|-id=987 bgcolor=#fefefe
| 440987 ||  || — || February 17, 2007 || Kitt Peak || Spacewatch || — || align=right data-sort-value="0.62" | 620 m || 
|-id=988 bgcolor=#fefefe
| 440988 ||  || — || February 17, 2007 || Socorro || LINEAR || — || align=right | 1.4 km || 
|-id=989 bgcolor=#d6d6d6
| 440989 ||  || — || February 17, 2007 || Kitt Peak || Spacewatch || — || align=right | 4.4 km || 
|-id=990 bgcolor=#d6d6d6
| 440990 ||  || — || February 17, 2007 || Kitt Peak || Spacewatch || — || align=right | 2.7 km || 
|-id=991 bgcolor=#d6d6d6
| 440991 ||  || — || February 16, 2007 || Palomar || NEAT || — || align=right | 4.0 km || 
|-id=992 bgcolor=#fefefe
| 440992 ||  || — || February 17, 2007 || Kitt Peak || Spacewatch || — || align=right data-sort-value="0.93" | 930 m || 
|-id=993 bgcolor=#d6d6d6
| 440993 ||  || — || February 17, 2007 || Kitt Peak || Spacewatch || — || align=right | 3.0 km || 
|-id=994 bgcolor=#fefefe
| 440994 ||  || — || February 17, 2007 || Kitt Peak || Spacewatch || — || align=right data-sort-value="0.90" | 900 m || 
|-id=995 bgcolor=#d6d6d6
| 440995 ||  || — || February 17, 2007 || Kitt Peak || Spacewatch || — || align=right | 2.9 km || 
|-id=996 bgcolor=#d6d6d6
| 440996 ||  || — || February 17, 2007 || Kitt Peak || Spacewatch || — || align=right | 3.9 km || 
|-id=997 bgcolor=#d6d6d6
| 440997 ||  || — || February 17, 2007 || Kitt Peak || Spacewatch || — || align=right | 2.7 km || 
|-id=998 bgcolor=#d6d6d6
| 440998 ||  || — || February 19, 2007 || Mount Lemmon || Mount Lemmon Survey || — || align=right | 2.4 km || 
|-id=999 bgcolor=#d6d6d6
| 440999 ||  || — || February 16, 2007 || Palomar || NEAT || — || align=right | 4.2 km || 
|-id=000 bgcolor=#d6d6d6
| 441000 ||  || — || November 18, 2006 || Mount Lemmon || Mount Lemmon Survey || — || align=right | 2.3 km || 
|}

References

External links 
 Discovery Circumstances: Numbered Minor Planets (440001)–(445000) (IAU Minor Planet Center)

0440